= List of Toto band members =

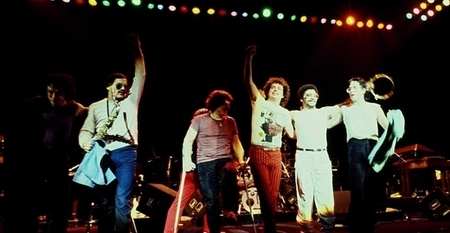
(left to right) Steve Porcaro, Jon Smith, Bobby Kimball, Steve Lukather, Lenny Castro and Jeff Porcaro (David Paich and Mike Porcaro not shown)

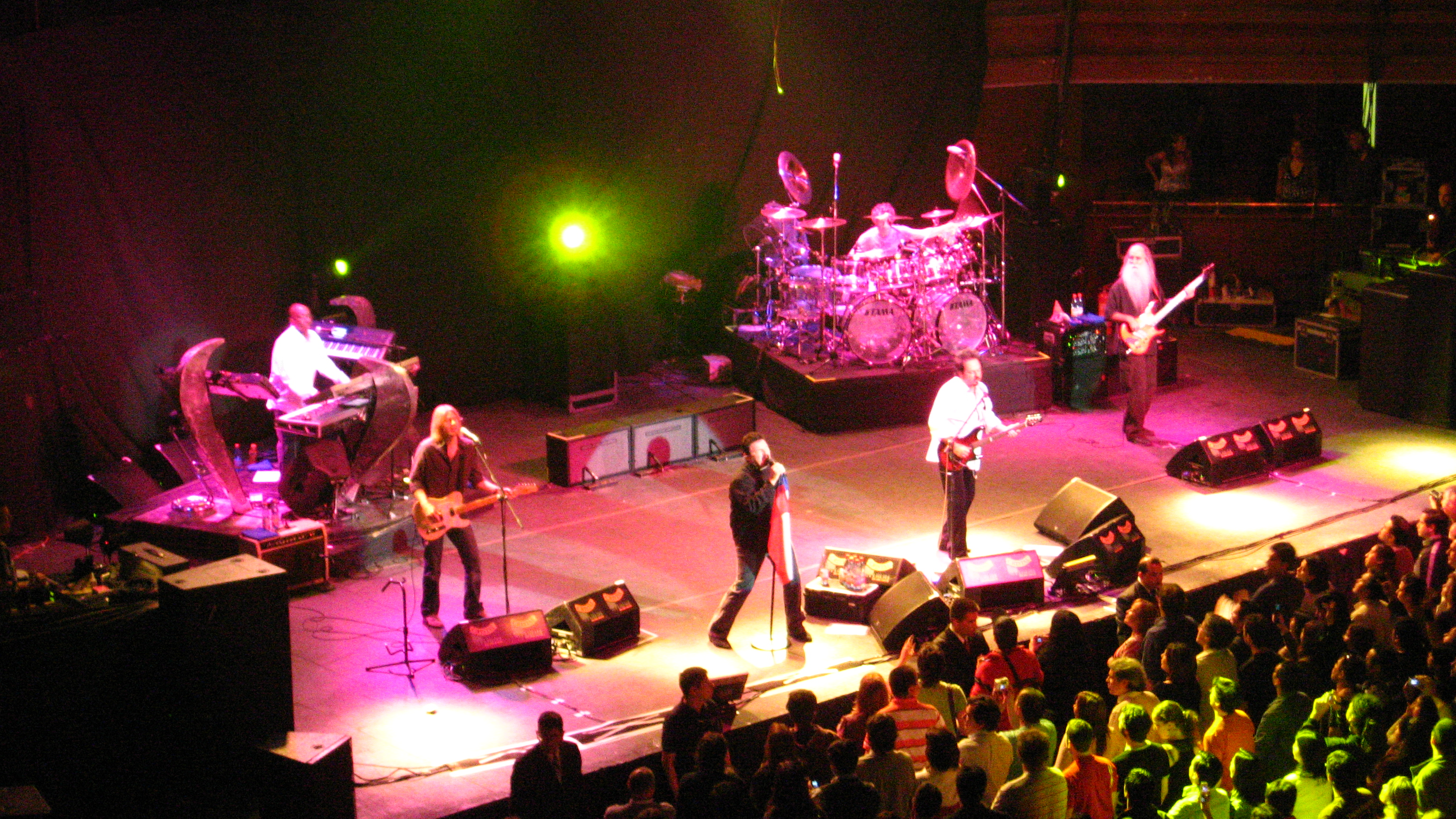
(left to right) Greg Phillinganes, Tony Spinner, Bobby Kimball, Simon Phillips, Steve Lukather and Leland Sklar

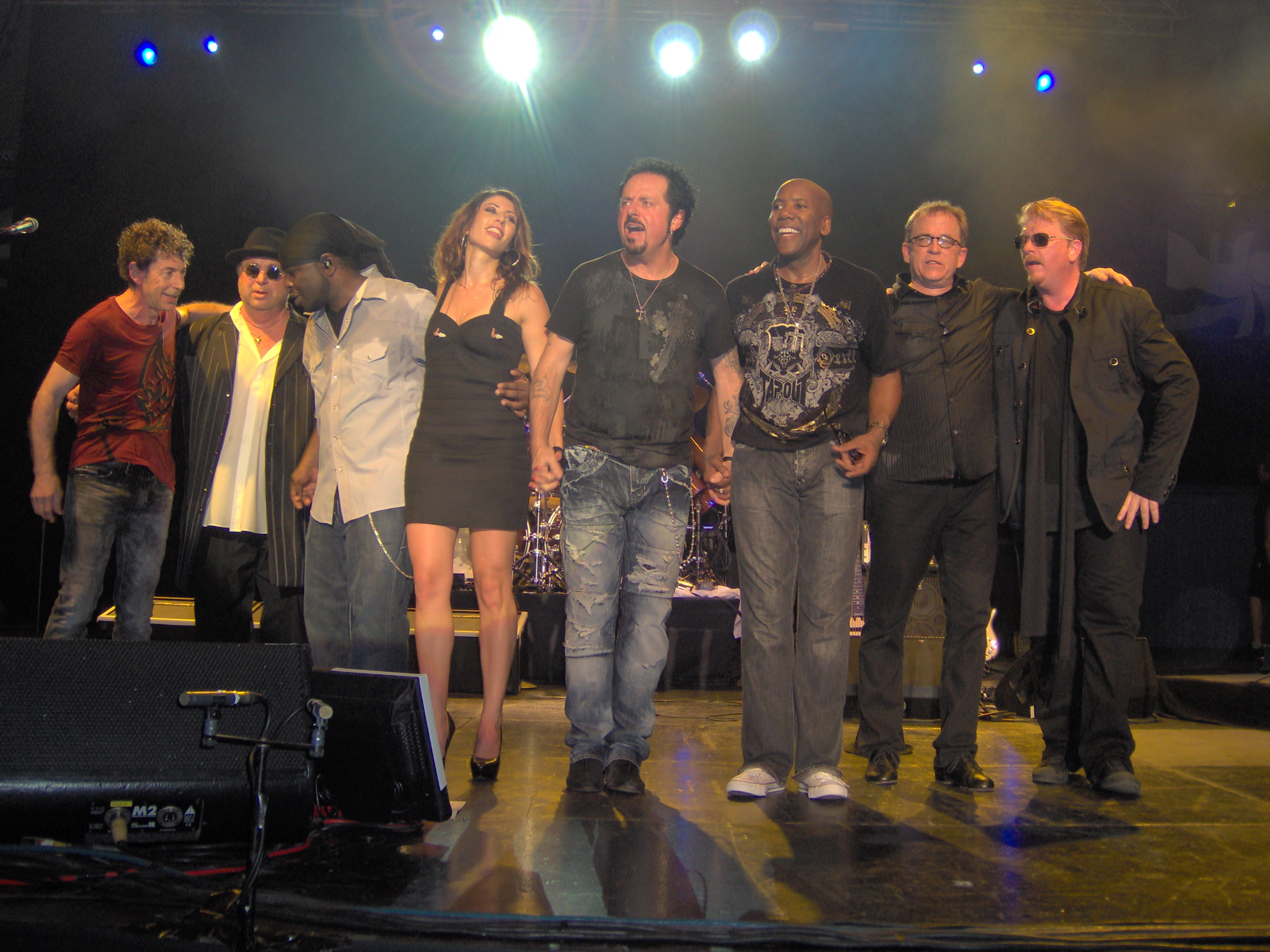
(left to right) Simon Philips, David Paich, Mabvuto Carpenter, Jory Steinberg, Steve Lukather, Nathan East, Steve Porcaro and Joseph Williams

Three lineups of Toto onstage in 1982, 2007 and 2010.

Toto is an American rock band from Los Angeles, California. Formed in 1977, the group's original lineup included lead vocalist Bobby Kimball, guitarist and vocalist Steve Lukather, keyboardist and vocalist David Paich, bassist David Hungate, keyboardist Steve Porcaro, and drummer Jeff Porcaro. The current lineup features constant member Lukather, and lead vocalist Joseph Williams (who originally joined in 1986, and rejoined in 2010). The band also tours with several additional musicians, currently bassist John Pierce (since 2020), keyboardists Dennis Atlas (since 2024) and Rai Thistlethwayte (since 2026), drummer Keith Carlock (who originally joined in 2014, and rejoined in 2026), and multi-instrumentalist Warren Ham (since 2017, and originally from 1986 to 1988). Paich is still in the band as a music director, but medically unfit to tour. He still makes guest appearances at random select concert dates.

== History ==
Toto was formed in 1977 by vocalist Bobby Kimball, guitarist and vocalist Steve Lukather, keyboardist and vocalist David Paich, bassist David Hungate, keyboardist Steve Porcaro and drummer Jeff Porcaro. Hungate left after the recording of the band's fourth album Toto IV in 1982, with Mike Porcaro (brother of Steve and Jeff) taking his place. Kimball left two years later, with Lukather crediting his dismissal to increasing vocal problems stemming from his cocaine use. He was replaced by Dennis "Fergie" Frederiksen (who performed on Isolation before), and later Jean-Michel Byron. Byron remained for the promotional tour for the album Past to Present 1977–1990, but did not get on with the rest of the band and left shortly thereafter, with no new frontman brought in to take his place. The band's constant drummer Jeff Porcaro died of a heart attack on August 5, 1992.

After briefly considering disbanding, Toto returned to touring, with Los Angeles-based British drummer Simon Phillips replacing Jeff Porcaro. The group continued as a four-piece throughout much of the 1990s, before reuniting with Kimball, Williams and Steve Porcaro in 1998 for a tour in promotion of the 20th anniversary compilation Toto XX: 1977–1997. After the tour, Kimball remained with the band. The group returned to a lineup with two keyboardists in 2005 with the addition of Greg Phillinganes, who had previously toured with the band in place of Paich. Mike Porcaro was forced to retire in 2007 due to illness, with Leland Sklar filling in. In June 2008, Lukather announced that he had left Toto, signalling the disbandment of the group. Writing on his website, he explained that the band members "had some differences in how business was being done".

Less than two years after the band's breakup, it was announced in February 2010 that Toto would be reforming for a run of shows in benefit of Mike Porcaro, who had been diagnosed with amyotrophic lateral sclerosis. Lukather, Paich and Phillips were joined by former members Joseph Williams and Steve Porcaro, and touring bassist Nathan East. The group continued touring over the next few years, before Phillips left in January 2014 during the recording of Toto XIV and was replaced by Keith Carlock. Original bassist David Hungate also returned for the album's touring cycle, with Shannon Forrest taking over from Carlock. The next lineup of Toto included Joseph Williams, Steve Lukather, David Paich, Steve Porcaro, Shem von Schroeck, Shannon Forrest, Lenny Castro and Warren Ham.

On October 19, 2020, it was announced that Steve Lukather and Joseph Williams would return to touring under the band name, in a proposed worldwide tour in 2021, known as the Dogz of Oz Tour. The new band lineup would feature bassist John Pierce (Huey Lewis and the News, Pablo Cruise, and a long-time session player), drummer Robert "Sput" Searight (Ghost-Note, Snarky Puppy), and keyboardists Dominique "Xavier" Taplin (Prince, Ghost-Note) and Steve Maggiora (Robert Jon & the Wreck), as well as long-time multi-instrumentalist Warren Ham. The tour began with a soft-opening: a worldwide live-streamed performance on November 21, 2020, during which David Paich appeared with the band for the final two songs. On April 12, 2021, the band announced that the Dogz of Oz World Tour would be pushed to 2022.

Toto has featured a wide range of additional musicians as part of its touring lineup. Notable past members of the band's touring lineup include keyboardist and technician John Jessel (from 1991 to 2004), guitarist and vocalist Tony Spinner (from 1999 to 2008), vocalist Buddy Hyatt (1999), bassist Leland Sklar (from 2007 to 2008, and in 2016), and backing vocalist Jenny Douglas-Foote (from 1990 to 1997, 2011 to 2012, and 2014 to 2016). Many of these additional musicians have also contributed to Toto's studio albums, both during their tenures and as guest contributors.

In January 2024, Toto announced the return of keyboardist Greg Phillinganes and drummer Shannon Forrest ahead of their 2024 tour, replacing Taplin and Searight respectively. In June, Dennis Atlas replaced Maggiora. On January 2, 2026, Phillinganes announced that he would be stepping away from the band to focus on his family. Australian musician Rai Thistlethwayte was recruited from Sammy Hagar's band to fill Phillinganes' place on keyboards, while Phillinganes took Thistlethwayte's place in Hagar's band. On May 5, 2026, drummer Shannon Forrest announced he would be leaving the band. The next day, it was announced that former member Keith Carlock would replace him.

== Official members ==
=== Current members ===
| Image | Name | Years active | Instruments | Release contributions |
|---|---|---|---|---|
| | Steve Lukather | 1977–2008; 2010–2019; 2020–present | guitar; lead and backing vocals; occasional bass, piano, keyboards and electronics | all Toto releases |
| | David Paich | 1977–2008; 2010–2019; 2020–present (retirement from touring 2005–2008, 2020–present) | keyboards; synthesizers; lead and backing vocals; occasional slide guitar and double bass | all Toto releases except Falling in Between Live (2007) |
| | Joseph Williams | 1986–1988; 1998; 2010–2019; 2020–present | lead and backing vocals; tambourine; occasional keyboards | Fahrenheit (1986); The Seventh One (1988); Toto XX: 1977–1997 (1998); Falling in Between (2006); 35th Anniversary: Live in Poland (2014); Toto XIV (2015); Old Is New (2018); 40 Tours Around the Sun (2019); With a Little Help from My Friends (2021) |

=== Former members ===
| Image | Name | Years active | Instruments | Release contributions |
|---|---|---|---|---|
| | Steve Porcaro | 1977–1988; 1998; 2010–2019 | synthesizers; keyboards; programming; electronics; occasional lead and backing vocals | all Toto releases from Toto (1978) to Kingdom of Desire (1992); Tambu (1995); Toto XX: 1977–1997 (1998); Mindfields (1999); Through the Looking Glass (2002); Falling in Between (2006); 35th Anniversary: Live in Poland (2014); Toto XIV (2015); Old Is New (2018); 40 Tours Around the Sun (2019) |
| | Jeff Porcaro | 1977–1992 (until his death) | drums; percussion | all Toto releases from Toto (1978) to Kingdom of Desire (1992); Toto XX: 1977–1997 (1998); Greatest Hits Live... and More (2002); Live at Montreux 1991 (2016); Old Is New (2018) |
| | Bobby Kimball | 1977–1984; 1989; 1998–2008 | lead and backing vocals; occasional keyboards | all Toto releases from Toto (1978) to Toto IV (1982); Toto XX: 1977–1997 (1998); Mindfields (1999); Livefields (1999); all Toto releases from Through the Looking Glass (2002) to Falling in Between Live (2007) |
| | David Hungate | 1977–1982; 2014–2015 | bass; occasional guitar | all Toto releases from Toto (1978) to Toto IV (1982); Toto XX: 1977–1997 (1998); Toto XIV (2015); Old Is New (2018) |
| | Mike Porcaro | 1982–2007 | bass; occasional cello and backing vocals | all Toto releases from Toto IV (1982) to Falling in Between (2006); Live at Montreux 1991 (2016); Old Is New (2018) |
| | Fergie Frederiksen | 1984–1985 | lead and backing vocals | Isolation (1984) |
| | Jean-Michel Byron | 1989–1990 | lead and backing vocals | Past to Present 1977–1990 (1990) – "Love Has the Power", "Out of Love", "Can You Hear What I'm Saying", and "Animal" only; Greatest Hits Live... and More (2002) |
| | Simon Phillips | 1992–2008; 2010–2014 | drums; percussion; occasional keyboards and backing vocals | all Toto releases from Absolutely Live (1993) to 35th Anniversary: Live in Poland (2014), except Greatest Hits Live... and More (2002) |
| | Greg Phillinganes | 2005–2008 (substitute for Paich 2003–2005, temporary substitute for Taplin 2022, touring member 2024–2026) | keyboards; synthesizers; lead and backing vocals | Falling in Between (2006); Falling in Between Live (2007) |

== Touring members ==
=== Current ===
| Image | Name | Years active | Instruments | Release contributions |
|---|---|---|---|---|
| | Warren Ham | 1986–1988; 2017–2019; 2020–present | saxophone; harmonica; flute; backing and occasional lead vocals; percussion | 40 Tours Around the Sun (2019); With a Little Help from My Friends (2021) |
| | John Pierce | 2020–present | bass; backing vocals | With a Little Help from My Friends (2021) |
| | Dennis Atlas | 2024–present | keyboards; vocals | none |
| | Rai Thistlethwayte | 2026–present | keyboards; vocals | none |
| | Keith Carlock | 2014 (official member); 2026–present | drums; percussion; backing vocals | Toto XIV (2015) |

=== Former ===
| Image | Name | Years active | Instruments | Release contributions |
|---|---|---|---|---|
| | Tom Kelly | 1978–1979 | guitar; backing vocals | Toto IV (1982); Isolation (1984); The Seventh One (1988) |
| | Lenny Castro | 1978–1979; 1982–1987; 1988; 2015–2019 | percussion; congas | Toto (1978); Hydra (1979); Toto IV (1982); Isolation (1984); Fahrenheit (1986); The Seventh One (1988); Kingdom of Desire (1992); Tambu (1995); Mindfields (1999); Through the Looking Glass (2002); Falling in Between (2006); Toto XIV (2015); Old Is New (2018); 40 Tours Around the Sun (2019) |
| | Keith Landry | 1980 | guitar; backing vocals | Live in Tokyo 1980 (2020) |
| | Jon Smith | 1982 | saxophone; percussion; backing vocals | Toto IV (1982) |
| | James Newton Howard | 1982 | keyboards; synthesizers | Toto IV (1982); Isolation (1984); Dune (1984); The Seventh One (1988) |
| | Timothy B. Schmit | 1982 | backing vocals; guitar; percussion | Toto IV (1982); Mindfields (1999) |
| | Scott Page | 1985 | saxophone; guitar; flute; percussion; backing vocals | none |
| | Paulette Brown-Castro | 1985–1987 (died 1998) | backing vocals | Fahrenheit (1986) |
| | Ralf Rickert | 1986–1987 | trumpet; backing vocals | none |
| | John Jessel | 1986–2003 | synthesizers; keyboards; samples; programming; backing and occasional lead vocals | Kingdom of Desire (1992); Absolutely Live (1993); Tambu (1995); Livefields (1999); Greatest Hits Live... and More (2002); 25th Anniversary: Live in Amsterdam (2003) |
| | Luis Conte | 1988 | percussion | Past to Present 1977–1990 (1990) |
| | Jacci McGhee-Peoples | 1990–1992 | backing vocals | Kingdom of Desire (1992); Absolutely Live (1993); Toto XX: 1977–1997 (1998); Greatest Hits Live... and More (2002); Live at Montreux 1991 (2016) |
| | Chris Trujillo | 1990–1993 | percussion | Kingdom of Desire (1992); Absolutely Live (1993); Toto XX: 1977–1997 (1998); Greatest Hits Live... and More (2002); Live at Montreux 1991 (2016) |
| | Jenny Douglas-Foote | 1990–1997; 2011–2012; 2014–2016 | backing vocals | all Toto releases from Kingdom of Desire (1992) to Toto XX: 1977–1997 (1998); Greatest Hits Live... and More (2002); Live at Montreux 1991 (2016) |
| | Fred White | 1991 | backing vocals | Live at Montreux 1991 (2016) |
| | Donna McDaniel | 1992–1994 | backing vocals | Absolutely Live (1993) |
| | John James | 1992–1998 | backing vocals | Absolutely Live (1993); Tambu (1995); Toto XX: 1977–1997 (1998) |
| | Sofia Bender (substitute for Jenny Douglas-Foote) | 1996 | backing vocals | none |
| | Gregg Bissonette (substitute for Simon Phillips) | 1995 | drums | none |
| | Buddy Hyatt | 1999–2000 | backing vocals; percussion | Livefields (1999) |
| | Jeff Babko (substitute for David Paich) | 2000 | keyboards | none |
| | Jon Farriss (substitute for Simon Phillips) | 2003 | drums | none |
| | Ricky Lawson (substitute for Simon Phillips) | 2003 (died 2013) | drums | none |
| | Tony Spinner | 1999–2008 | backing vocals; guitar | Livefields (1999); 25th Anniversary - Live in Amsterdam (2003); Falling in Between Live (2007) |
| | Leland Sklar | 2007–2008; 2016 | bass | Falling in Between Live (2007); Toto XIV (2015) |
| | Jory Steinberg | 2010 | backing vocals | none |
| | Nathan East | 2010–2014 | bass; backing vocals | 35th Anniversary: Live in Poland (2014) |
| | Dave Santos (substitute for David Hungate) | 2015 | bass | none |
| | Mabvuto Carpenter | 2010–2016 | backing vocals | 35th Anniversary: Live in Poland (2014); Toto XIV (2015) |
| | Amy Keys | 2013–2014 | backing vocals | 35th Anniversary: Live in Poland (2014); Toto XIV (2015) |
| | Shannon Forrest | 2014–2019; 2024–2026 | drums | 40 Tours Around the Sun (2019) |
| | Shem von Schroeck | 2017–2019 | bass; backing vocals | 40 Tours Around the Sun (2019) |
| | Dominique "Xavier" Taplin | 2018–2019; 2020–2024 | keyboards; vocals | With a Little Help From My Friends (2021) |
| | Steve Maggiora | 2020–2024 | keyboards; vocals | With a Little Help From My Friends (2021) |
| | Robert "Sput" Searight | 2020–2024 | drums; percussion; backing vocals | With a Little Help From My Friends (2021) |

== Session musicians ==
| Image | Name | Years active | Instruments | Release contributions |
|---|---|---|---|---|
| | Marty Paich | 1977–1979; 1981–1982; 1984; 1987–1988 (died 1995) | string arrangements, conductor | Toto (1978); Hydra (1979); Toto IV (1982); Isolation (1984); The Seventh One (1988) |
| | Roger Linn | 1977–1979; 1981–1982 | synthesizers; programming | Toto (1978); Hydra (1979); Toto IV (1982) |
| | Jim Horn | 1977–1978; 1981–1982; 1987–1988; 1999 | saxophone; wind instruments; recorders; flute; horns | Toto (1978); Toto IV (1982); The Seventh One (1988); Mindfields (1999) |
| | Chuck Findley | 1977–1978; 1984; 1986; 1987–1988; 1992; 1999 | horns; trumpet | Toto (1978); Isolation (1984); Fahrenheit (1986); The Seventh One (1988); Kingdom of Desire (1992); Mindfields (1999) |
| | Cheryl Lynn | 1977–1978 | backing vocals | Toto (1978) |
| | Sid Sharp | 1977–1978 | string arrangements | Toto (1978) |
| | Michael Boddicker | 1979 | synthesizer samples | Hydra (1979) |
| | Joe Porcaro | 1980–1982; 1984; 1986–1988; 1992 (died 2020) | percussion; xylophone; timpani; marimba | Turn Back (1981); Toto IV (1982); Isolation (1984); Fahrenheit (1986); The Seventh One (1988); Kingdom of Desire (1992) |
| | Tom Scott | 1981–1982; 1984; 1986–1988; 1999; 2005; 2013–2014 | saxophone; horns; horn arrangements; tenor saxophone | Toto IV (1982); Isolation (1984); Fahrenheit (1986); The Seventh One (1988); Mindfields (1999); Falling in Between (2006); Toto XIV (2015) |
| | Jerry Hey | 1981–1982; 1984; 1986; 1987–1988 | trumpet; horn arrangements; horns | Toto IV (1982); Isolation (1984); Fahrenheit (1986); The Seventh One (1988) |
| | Jimmy Pankow | 1981–1982; 1987–1988; 2005 | horns; trombone; horn arrangements | Toto IV (1982); The Seventh One (1988); Falling in Between (2006) |
| | Gary Grant | 1981–1982; 1988–1987; 1999 (died 2024) | trumpet | Toto IV (1982); The Seventh One (1988); Mindfields (1999) |
| | Ralph Dyck | 1981–1982 | synthesizers | Toto IV (1982) |
| | The Martyn Ford Orchestra | 1981–1982 | strings | Toto IV (1982) |
| | Richard Page | 1984; 1992; 1999 | backing vocals | Isolation (1984); Kingdom of Desire (1992); Mindfields (1999) |
| | Mike Cotten | 1984 | synthesizers | Isolation (1984) |
| | The London Symphony Orchestra | 1984 | strings | Isolation (1984) |
| | Gene Morford | 1984 | bass vocal | Isolation (1984) |
| | Virginia Madsen | 1984 | narration | Dune (1984) |
| | Vienna Symphony Orchestra | 1984 | strings | Dune (1984) |
| | Kenneth McMillan | 1984 (died 1989) | dialogue | Dune (1984) |
| | Paul Smith | 1984 (died 2012) | dialogue | Dune (1984) |
| | Jim Keltner | 1986–1988; 1992 | percussion | Fahrenheit (1986); The Seventh One (1988); Kingdom of Desire (1992) |
| | Michael McDonald | 1986; 1995; 2013–2014 | backing vocals | Fahrenheit (1986); Tambu (1995); Toto XIV (2015) |
| | Paulinho da Costa | 1986; 1995 | percussion | Fahrenheit (1986); Tambu (1995) |
| | "Sidney" | 1986 | percussion | Fahrenheit (1986) |
| | Steve Jordan | 1986 | percussion | Fahrenheit (1986) |
| | Larry Williams | 1986 | saxophones | Fahrenheit (1986) |
| | David Sanborn | 1986 (died 2024) | saxophones | Fahrenheit (1986) |
| | Charles Loper | 1986 | trombone | Fahrenheit (1986) |
| | Bill Reichenbach Jr. | 1986 | trombone | Fahrenheit (1986) |
| | Miles Davis | 1986 (died 1991) | trumpet | Fahrenheit (1986) |
| | Amin Bhatia | 1986 | synthesizer | Fahrenheit (1986) |
| | Paulette Brown | 1986 | backing vocals | Fahrenheit (1986) |
| | Tony Walthes | 1986 | backing vocals | Fahrenheit (1986) |
| | Don Henley | 1986 | backing vocals | Fahrenheit (1986) |
| | Michael Sherwood | 1986 (died 2019) | backing vocals | Fahrenheit (1986) |
| | Gary Herbig | 1987–1988; 1992 | horns; saxophone | The Seventh One (1988); Kingdom of Desire (1992) |
| | Michael Fisher | 1987–1988; 1995 | percussion | The Seventh One (1988); Tambu (1995) |
| | Patti Austin | 1987–1988 | backing vocals | The Seventh One (1988) |
| | Jon Anderson | 1987–1988 | backing vocals | The Seventh One (1988) |
| | Linda Ronstadt | 1987–1988 | backing vocals | The Seventh One (1988) |
| | Bill Payne | 1987–1988 | keyboards | The Seventh One (1988) |
| | Andy Narell | 1987–1988 | steel drums | The Seventh One (1988) |
| | David Lindley | 1987–1988 (died 2023) | lap steel | The Seventh One (1988) |
| | Phillip Ingram | 1992; 1995 | backing vocals | Kingdom of Desire (1992); Tambu (1995) |
| | Stan Lynch | 1992; 1995 | backing vocals | Kingdom of Desire (1992); Tambu (1995) |
| | C. J. Vanston | 1992; 2013–2014 | synthesizers; keyboards; backing vocals; piano | Kingdom of Desire (1992); Toto XIV (2015) |
| | Bobby Womack | 1992 (died 2014) | backing vocals | Kingdom of Desire (1992) |
| | John Elefante | 1992 | backing vocals | Kingdom of Desire (1992) |
| | Alex Brown | 1992 | backing vocals | Kingdom of Desire (1992) |
| | Angel Rogers | 1992 | backing vocals | Kingdom of Desire (1992) |
| | Fred White | 1992 | backing vocals | Kingdom of Desire (1992) |
| | Steve George | 1992 | backing vocals | Kingdom of Desire (1992) |
| | John Fogerty | 1992 | backing vocals | Kingdom of Desire (1992) |
| | Kevin Dorsey | 1992 | backing vocals | Kingdom of Desire (1992) |
| | Arnold McCuller | 1992 | backing vocals | Kingdom of Desire (1992) |
| | Billy Sherwood | 1992 | backing vocals | Kingdom of Desire (1992) |
| | Phil Perry | 1992 | backing vocals | Kingdom of Desire (1992) |
| | Don Menza | 1992 | saxophone | Kingdom of Desire (1992) |
| | Ricky Nelson | 1995 | backing vocals | Tambu (1995) |
| | Jim Giddens | 1995 | S.P. chant | Tambu (1995) |
| | Elliot Scheiner | 1995 | S.P. chant | Tambu (1995) |
| | Clint Black | 1999 | harmonica; backing vocals | Mindfields (1999) |
| | Bill Reichenbach Jr. | 1999 | horns | Mindfields (1999) |
| | Mark Hudson | 1999 | backing vocals | Mindfields (1999) |
| | Phil Soussan | 1999 | backing vocals | Mindfields (1999) |
| | Chris Thompson | 1999 | backing vocals | Mindfields (1999) |
| | Maria Vidal | 1999 | backing vocals | Mindfields (1999) |
| | Monet | 2001–2002; 2005 | backing vocals; ad-libs | Through the Looking Glass (2002); Falling in Between (2006) |
| | James Ingram | 2001–2002 (died 2019) | backing vocals; ad-libs | Through the Looking Glass (2002) |
| | Brandon Fields | 2001–2002 | tenor saxophone; alto saxophone; soprano saxophone | Through the Looking Glass (2002) |
| | Walt Fowler | 2001–2002 | trumpet; flugelhorn | Through the Looking Glass (2002) |
| | Tippa Irie | 2001–2002 | DJ | Through the Looking Glass (2002) |
| | Ellis Hall | 2001–2002 | vocals | Through the Looking Glass (2002) |
| | Davey Johnstone | 2001–2002 | backing vocals | Through the Looking Glass (2002) |
| | Nigel Olsson | 2001–2002 | backing vocals | Through the Looking Glass (2002) |
| | Trevor Lukather | 2005; 2016–2017 | backing vocals; additional instrumentation | Falling in Between (2006); Old Is New (2018) |
| | Ian Anderson | 2005 | flute | Falling in Between (2006) |
| | L. Shankar | 2005 | violin | Falling in Between (2006) |
| | Ray Herrmann | 2005 | tenor saxophone | Falling in Between (2006) |
| | Lee Thornburg | 2005 | trumpet | Falling in Between (2006) |
| | Roy Hargrove | 2005 (died 2018) | trumpet and flugelhorn | Falling in Between (2006) |
| | Jason Scheff | 2005 | backing vocals | Falling in Between (2006) |
| | James Tormé | 2005 | backing vocals | Falling in Between (2006) |
| | Martin Tillman | 2013–2014; 2016–2017 | cello | Toto XIV (2015); Old Is New (2018) |
| | Tal Wilkenfeld | 2013–2014 | bass guitar | Toto XIV (2015) |
| | Tim Lefebvre | 2013–2014 | bass guitar | Toto XIV (2015) |
| | Jamie Savko | 2013–2014 | backing vocals | Toto XIV (2015) |
| | Emma Williams | 2013–2014 | backing vocals | Toto XIV (2015) |
| | Vinnie Colaiuta | 2016–2017 | drums | Old Is New (2018) |
| | Mark T. Williams | 2016–2017 | backing vocals | Old Is New (2018) |
| | Pat Knox | 2016–2017 | backing vocals | Old Is New (2018) |
| | Lorraine Paich | 2016–2017 | backing vocals | Old Is New (2018) |
| | Weston Wilson | 2016–2017 | backing vocals | Old Is New (2018) |
| | What So Not | 2016–2017 | instrumentation | Old Is New (2018) |
| | James Rushent | 2016–2017 | additional instrumentation | Old Is New (2018) |
| | Surahn Sidhu | 2016–2017 | additional instrumentation | Old Is New (2018) |

== Timelines ==
=== Recording timeline ===
| Role | Lead Vocals | Guitar/vocals | Bass | Keyboards/vocals | Synthesizers | Drums |
|---|---|---|---|---|---|---|
| Toto (1978) | Bobby Kimball | Steve Lukather | David Hungate | David Paich | Steve Porcaro | Jeff Porcaro |
| Hydra (1979) | Bobby Kimball | Steve Lukather | David Hungate | David Paich | Steve Porcaro | Jeff Porcaro |
| Turn Back (1981) | Bobby Kimball | Steve Lukather | David Hungate | David Paich | Steve Porcaro | Jeff Porcaro |
| Toto IV (1982) | Bobby Kimball | Steve Lukather | David Hungate | David Paich | Steve Porcaro | Jeff Porcaro |
| Isolation (1984) | Fergie Frederiksen | Steve Lukather | Mike Porcaro | David Paich | Steve Porcaro | Jeff Porcaro |
| Dune (1984) | no-one | Steve Lukather | Mike Porcaro | David Paich | Steve Porcaro | Jeff Porcaro |
| Fahrenheit (1986) | Joseph Williams | Steve Lukather | Mike Porcaro | David Paich | Steve Porcaro | Jeff Porcaro |
| The Seventh One (1988) | Joseph Williams | Steve Lukather | Mike Porcaro | David Paich | Steve Porcaro | Jeff Porcaro |
| Kingdom of Desire (1992) | Steve Lukather | Steve Lukather | Mike Porcaro | David Paich | Steve Porcaro/ John Jessel | Jeff Porcaro |
| Tambu (1995) | Steve Lukather | Steve Lukather | Mike Porcaro | David Paich | David Paich | Simon Phillips |
| Toto XX (1998) | various singers | Steve Lukather | Mike Porcaro/ David Hungate | David Paich | Steve Porcaro | Jeff Porcaro |
| Mindfields (1999) | Bobby Kimball | Steve Lukather | Mike Porcaro | David Paich | no-one | Simon Phillips |
| Through the Looking Glass (2002) | Bobby Kimball | Steve Lukather | Mike Porcaro | David Paich | no-one | Simon Phillips |
| Falling in Between (2006) | Bobby Kimball | Steve Lukather | Mike Porcaro | David Paich | Greg Phillinganes | Simon Phillips |
| Toto XIV (2015) | Joseph Williams | Steve Lukather | David Hungate | David Paich | Steve Porcaro | Keith Carlock |
| Old Is New (2018) | Joseph Williams | Steve Lukather | David Hungate/ Mike Porcaro | David Paich | Steve Porcaro | Jeff Porcaro/ Vinnie Colaiuta |

== Lineups ==
| Period | Personnel | | Releases |
| Period | Official members | Touring musicians | Releases |
|---|---|---|---|
| 1977–1982 | Bobby Kimball – lead and backing vocals; Steve Lukather – guitar, backing and lead vocals; David Paich – keyboards, backing and lead vocals; Steve Porcaro – keyboards, electronics; David Hungate – bass, guitar; Jeff Porcaro – drums, percussion | Lenny Castro – percussion, congas (from 1979); Tom Kelly – guitar, backing vocals (1979); Keith Landry – guitar, backing vocals (1980) | Toto (1978); Hydra (1979); Turn Back (1981); Toto IV (1982) |
| 1982–1984 | Bobby Kimball – lead and backing vocals; Steve Lukather – guitar, backing and lead vocals; David Paich – keyboards, backing and lead vocals; Steve Porcaro – keyboards, electronics; Mike Porcaro – bass; Jeff Porcaro – drums, percussion | Lenny Castro – percussion, congas; Jon Smith – saxophone, backing vocals (1982); Timothy B. Schmit – backing vocals (1982); James Newton Howard – keyboards (1982) | none |
| 1984–1985 | Fergie Frederiksen – lead and backing vocals; Steve Lukather – guitar, backing and lead vocals; David Paich – keyboards, backing and lead vocals; Steve Porcaro – keyboards, electronics; Mike Porcaro – bass; Jeff Porcaro – drums, percussion | Lenny Castro – percussion, congas; Scott Page – saxophone, guitar, backing vocals; Paulette Brown-Castro – backing vocals | Isolation (1984); Dune (1984) (without Frederiksen) |
| 1985–1987 | Joseph Williams – lead and backing vocals; Steve Lukather – guitar, backing and lead vocals; David Paich – keyboards, backing and lead vocals; Steve Porcaro – keyboards, electronics; Mike Porcaro – bass; Jeff Porcaro – drums, percussion | Lenny Castro – percussion, congas; Paulette Brown-Castro – backing vocals; Warren Ham – saxophone, backing vocals; Ralph Rickert – saxophone, backing vocals | Fahrenheit (1986) |
| 1988 | Joseph Williams – lead and backing vocals; Steve Lukather – guitar, backing and lead vocals; David Paich – keyboards, backing and lead vocals; Mike Porcaro – bass; Jeff Porcaro – drums, percussion | Steve Porcaro – keyboards, electronics; Luis Conte – percussion; Warren Ham – saxophone, backing vocals; Lenny Castro – percussion (one-off performance on tour) | The Seventh One (1988) |
| 1988–1989 | Steve Lukather – guitar, lead and backing vocals; David Paich – keyboards, backing and lead vocals; Mike Porcaro – bass; Jeff Porcaro – drums, percussion | none | none |
| 1989 | Bobby Kimball – lead vocals; Steve Lukather – guitar, backing and lead vocals; David Paich – keyboards, backing and lead vocals; Mike Porcaro – bass; Jeff Porcaro – drums, percussion | none | "Goin' Home" (1998) |
| 1990 | Jean-Michel Byron – lead and backing vocals; Steve Lukather – guitar, backing and lead vocals; David Paich – keyboards, backing and lead vocals; Mike Porcaro – bass; Jeff Porcaro – drums, percussion | John Jessel – keyboards, backing vocals; Chris Trujillo – percussion; Jacci McGhee-Peoples – backing vocals; Jenny Douglas-Foote – backing vocals | Past to Present 1977–1990 (1990) |
| 1991–1992 | Steve Lukather – guitar, lead and backing vocals; David Paich – keyboards, backing and lead vocals; Mike Porcaro – bass; Jeff Porcaro – drums, percussion | John Jessel – keyboards, backing vocals; Chris Trujillo – percussion; Jenny Douglas-Foote – backing vocals; Jacci McGhee-Peoples – backing vocals; Fred White – backing vocals (1991) | Kingdom of Desire (1992); Live at Montreux 1991 (2016) |
| 1992–1998 | Steve Lukather – guitar, lead and backing vocals; David Paich – keyboards, backing and lead vocals; Mike Porcaro – bass; Simon Phillips – drums, percussion | John Jessel – keyboards, backing vocals; Jenny Douglas-Foote – backing vocals; John James – backing vocals; Donna McDaniel – backing vocals (until 1994); Chris Trujillo – percussion (until 1993); Gregg Bissonette – drums (1995 substitute); Sofia Bender – backing vocals (1996 substitute) | Absolutely Live (1993); Tambu (1995) |
| 1998–2005 | Bobby Kimball – lead and backing vocals; Steve Lukather – guitar, backing and lead vocals; David Paich – keyboards, backing and lead vocals; Mike Porcaro – bass; Simon Phillips – drums, percussion | Tony Spinner – guitar, backing vocals; John Jessel – keyboards, backing vocals (until 2003); Buddy Hyatt – backing vocals, percussion (1999–2000); Jeff Babko – keyboards (2000 substitute); Greg Philinganes – keyboards, backing vocals (2003–2005 substitute); Jon Farriss – drums (2003 substitute); Ricky Lawson – drums (2003 substitute) | Mindfields (1999); Livefields (1999); Through the Looking Glass (2002); Live in Amsterdam (2003) |
| 2005–2007 | Bobby Kimball – lead and backing vocals; Steve Lukather – guitar, backing and lead vocals; David Paich – keyboards, backing and lead vocals (semi-retirement from touring); Greg Phillinganes – keyboards, backing and lead vocals; Mike Porcaro – bass; Simon Phillips – drums, percussion | Tony Spinner – guitar, backing vocals | Falling in Between (2006) |
| 2007–2008 | Bobby Kimball – lead and backing vocals; Steve Lukather – guitar, backing and lead vocals; David Paich – keyboards, backing and lead vocals (semi-retirement from touring); Greg Phillinganes – keyboards, backing and lead vocals; Simon Phillips – drums, percussion | Tony Spinner – guitar, backing vocals; Leland Sklar – bass | Falling in Between Live (2007) (does not feature Paich) |
Band inactive June 2008 – February 2010
| February 2010 – January 2014 | Joseph Williams – lead and backing vocals; Steve Lukather – guitar, backing and lead vocals; David Paich – keyboards, backing and lead vocals; Steve Porcaro – keyboards, electronics, occasional lead vocals; Simon Phillips – drums, percussion | Nathan East – bass, backing vocals; Mabvuto Carpenter – backing vocals; Jory Steinberg – backing vocals (2010); Jenny Douglas-Foote – backing vocals (2011–12); Amy Keys – backing vocals (from 2013) | 35th Anniversary: Live in Poland (2014) |
| January – May 2014 | Joseph Williams – lead and backing vocals; Steve Lukather – guitar, backing and lead vocals; David Paich – keyboards, backing and lead vocals; Steve Porcaro – keyboards, electronics, occasional lead vocals; Keith Carlock – drums, percussion | Nathan East – bass, backing vocals; Mabvuto Carpenter – backing vocals; Amy Keys – backing vocals | Toto XIV (2015) |
| May 2014 – September 2015 | Joseph Williams – lead and backing vocals; Steve Lukather – guitar, backing and lead vocals; David Paich – keyboards, backing and lead vocals; Steve Porcaro – keyboards, electronics, occasional lead vocals; David Hungate – bass | Shannon Forrest – drums; Mabvuto Carpenter – backing vocals; Jenny Douglas-Foote – backing vocals; Lenny Castro – percussion, congas (from 2015) | Toto XIV (2015) – four tracks |
| November 2015 – October 2019 | Joseph Williams – lead and backing vocals; Steve Lukather – guitar, backing and lead vocals; David Paich – keyboards, backing and lead vocals; Steve Porcaro – keyboards, electronics, occasional lead vocals | Shannon Forrest – drums; Lenny Castro – percussion, congas; David Santos – bass (2015 substitute); Mabvuto Carpenter – backing vocals (until 2016); Jenny Douglas-Foote – backing vocals (until 2016); Leland Sklar – bass (2016); Shem von Schroek – bass, backing vocals (from 2017); Warren Ham – saxophone, flute, backing vocals (from 2017); Dominique "Xavier" Taplin – keyboards, backing vocals (from 2018, substitute) | Old Is New (2018); 40 Tours Around the Sun (2019) |
Band inactive October 2019 – October 2020
| October 2020 – present | Joseph Williams – lead and backing vocals; Steve Lukather – guitar, backing and lead vocals; David Paich – keyboards, backing and lead vocals (semi-retirement from touring) | John Pierce – bass, backing vocals; Dominique "Xavier" Taplin – keyboards, backing vocals (until 2024); Steve Maggiora – keyboards, backing and occasional lead vocals (until 2024); Warren Ham – saxophone, flute, backing and occasional lead vocals, percussion; Robert "Sput" Searight – drums, backing vocals (until 2024); Greg Phillinganes – keyboards, backing and occasional lead vocals (2022 substitute; 2024–2025); Shannon Forrest – drums (from 2024); Dennis Atlas – keyboards, backing and occasional lead vocals (from 2024); Rai Thistlethwayte – keyboards, backing vocals (from 2026) | With a Little Help from My Friends (2021) |
