= Kingdom of Desire =

Studio album by Toto
- Released: September 7, 1992 (EU & JP); May 11, 1993 (US)
- Recorded: February 1991 – May 1992
- Studios: A&M Studios (Hollywood); Skywalker Studios (Nicasio); Schnee Studios (North Hollywood); Devonshire Studios (North Hollywood); Record One (Sherman Oaks); Rumbo Recorders (Canoga Park); Castle Oaks Studios (Calabasas); Track Record (North Hollywood); Mad Hatter Studios (Los Angeles); Pacifique Studios (North Hollywood); Record Plant (Los Angeles); The Enterprise (Burbank)
- Genres: Hard rock; heavy metal
- Length: 69:28
- Labels: Columbia (Europe); Relativity (United States)
- Producers: Toto, Danny Kortchmar

Toto chronology
Past to Present 1977–1990 (1990)	Kingdom of Desire (1992)	Tambu (1995)

Singles from Kingdom of Desire
- 1. "Don't Chain My Heart" Released: August 17, 1992; 2. "Only You" Released: September 9, 1992; 3. "2 Hearts" Released: 1992 (EU); 4. "The Other Side" Released: 1992 (EU)

Professional ratings
Review scores
Source	Rating
Allmusic	2/5 stars

Kingdom of Desire is the eighth studio album by Toto, released internationally in September 1992. It is the first album on which guitarist Steve Lukather assumed sole lead vocal duties and the final album to feature drummer Jeff Porcaro, who died during rehearsals for the tour promoting this album, and the last album which involved all the Porcaro brothers together (although Steve was featured as a session musician at the time). The album was mixed by Bob Clearmountain and dedicated to Jeff in his memory. The album was released in May 1993 in the United States.

== Background and recording ==
During the tour for The Seventh One, lead singer Joseph Williams was fired from Toto. In between The Seventh One and Kingdom of Desire, the band released Past to Present, a compilation album which contained four new tracks. Multiple vocalists were considered to replace Williams for the new tracks, including original singer Bobby Kimball (although not included on Past to Present, Kimball's contribution "Goin' Home" would ultimately be released on Toto XX). At the suggestion of Columbia director of A&R, the band ultimately auditioned South African singer Jean-Michael Byron. Byron was championed by Jeff Porcaro and hired by the band to perform the new tracks on Past to Present. Steve Lukather described Byron's live performances with Toto as "horrifying." As a result, not unlike the prior tour with Williams, Lukather was pressed into often assuming lead vocals. Byron became the fourth lead vocalist fired by Toto.

Left once again without a lead singer, the band decided their next album would be performed by the core band, Lukather, Jeff Porcaro, David Paich, and Mike Porcaro, and would be a more rock-oriented record, not unlike their fifth album, Isolation. Lukather would assume lead vocals for the album. Kingdom of Desire was recorded throughout most of 1991, primarily written through jam sessions, though two tracks were written by Danny Kortchmar, "Kick Down the Walls" and the title track. The basic tracks and overdubs were done at Skywalker Studios in California with producer Greg Ladanyi and mixed by Bob Clearmountain.

During the recording of Kingdom of Desire, Toto did a summer tour in Europe, where they played the Montreux Jazz Festival. In addition to classic tracks like "Africa" and "I'll Be Over You," the band performed "Kingdom of Desire" and "Jake to the Bone," both of which would appear on Kingdom of Desire. A CD, DVD and Blu-ray of the performance was released in 2016 as Live at Montreux.

Jeff Porcaro died on August 5, 1992, of heart disease, one month before the release of Kingdom of Desire. He was 38 years old. AllMusic describes Porcaro as "arguably the most highly regarded studio drummer from the mid-70s to the early 90s." He would be inducted into the Modern Drummer Hall of Fame in 1993. In live shows, Toto has often dedicated Kingdom of Desire track "Wings of Time" to Porcaro, who wrote the lyrics, and later, to his brother, Mike, who died from complications of ALS on March 15, 2015. The final line from the song's chorus can be found on his tombstone at Forest Lawn Memorial Park (Hollywood Hills).

== Reception and tour ==
Upon completing the album, Columbia Records executives indicated they were unhappy with Kingdom of Desire and were not going to release it. Lukather has indicated this was the "last straw" between Toto and Columbia and they would immediately start looking to leave the label. Columbia was not willing to release the band and they would record two more albums for the label, Tambu and Mindfields. Kingdom of Desire was released outside of the U.S. in September 1992 and was well received. Thus, the single "Don't Chain My Heart" charted in Europe during the winter of 1992–1993. Eight months later, Columbia relented and also released the album in the U.S. on its Relativity label.

Toto had sold out a number of arena dates in Europe to support Kingdom of Desire prior to the death of Jeff Porcaro. Though devastated by the loss of a founding member and lifelong friend, the band asked Simon Phillips to play drums on the forthcoming tour. The first song the band rehearsed with Phillips was "Hydra" and his performance made a strong impression on Paich, Lukather, and Mike Porcaro. Phillips would become a permanent member of Toto and remain with them for the next 21 years. Toto has credited him with helping them continue on after the tragic loss of Jeff Porcaro.

Kingdom of Desire has an AllMusic User rating of four stars and AllMusic Rating of two stars.

== Track listing ==
All tracks are written by Toto, except where noted

No.	Title	Writer(s)	Length
1.	"Gypsy Train"		6:45
2.	"Don't Chain My Heart"		4:46
3.	"Never Enough"	Toto, Fee Waybill	5:45
4.	"How Many Times"		5:42
5.	"2 Hearts"		5:13
6.	"Wings of Time"		7:27
7.	"She Knows the Devil"		5:25
8.	"The Other Side"	David Paich, Billy Sherwood, Rory Kaplan	4:41
9.	"Only You"		4:28
10.	"Kick Down the Walls^{†}"	Danny Kortchmar, Stan Lynch	4:54
11.	"Kingdom of Desire"	Kortchmar	7:16
12.	"Jake to the Bone" (Instrumental)		7:05

Japanese edition bonus track
No.	Title	Writer(s)	Length
13.	"Little Wing" (Live)	Jimi Hendrix	4:15

^{†} - Absent on the initial European LP release of the album

== Personnel ==
=== Toto ===
- Steve Lukather – guitars, lead vocals, backing vocals
- David Paich – piano, keyboards, synthesizers, organ, backing vocals
- Mike Porcaro – bass
- Jeff Porcaro – drums, percussion

==== Additional musicians ====
- Steve Porcaro – synthesizers
- John Jessel – synthesizer programming
- C. J. Vanston – synthesizers (8)
- Lenny Castro – percussion (3, 7)
- Jim Keltner – percussion (8)
- Chris Trujillo – percussion (8, 12)
- Joe Porcaro – percussion (9, 12)
- Gary Herbig – saxophone (3)
- Don Menza – saxophone (3)
- Chuck Findley – trumpet (3)
- John Elefante – backing vocals (1)
- Alex Brown – backing vocals (2, 11)
- Phillip Ingram – backing vocals (2, 8, 11)
- Angel Rogers – backing vocals (2)
- Fred White – backing vocals (2)
- Steve George – backing vocals (4)
- Richard Page – backing vocals (4–6, 10)
- Bobby Womack – backing vocals (7)
- John Fogerty – backing vocals (7) (uncredited)
- Kevin Dorsey – backing vocals (8, 11)
- Arnold McCuller – backing vocals (8, 11)
- Billy Sherwood – backing vocals (8)
- Stan Lynch – backing vocals (10)
- Jenny Douglas-McRae – backing vocals (11)
- Jacci McGhee – backing vocals (11)
- Phil Perry – backing vocals (11)

=== Technical ===
- Produced by Toto and Danny Kortchmar (10)
- Engineers – Niko Bolas, John Jessel, Greg Ladanyi and Jess Sutcliffe
- Recorded by Anas Allaf, Mike Arvold, Shawn Berman, Kyle Bess, Ken Deranteriasian, Bob Edwards, Jeff Graham, Rob Jaczko, Dick Kaneshiro, Fred Kelly Jr., Ed Korengo, Keith Kresge, Tim Larber, Randy Long, Jeff Lorenzen, Rick Plant, Chris Rich, Rail Rogut, Thom Russo, Darian Sahanaja, M.T. Silva, Mick Stern, Bart Stevens and Randy Wine
- Mixed by Bob Clearmountain at The Record Plant and A&M Studios, Los Angeles
- Mastered by Bob Ludwig at Masterdisk, New York
- Production coordinator – Jess Sutcliffe
- Art direction – Nancy Donald
- Illustration and logo design – Rick Patrick
- Photography – Dennis Keeley

== Additional notes ==
Catalogue: Relativity 1181

The lyrics printed on the cassette liner or in the CD booklet have the second chorus of each song translated into a foreign language - German (track 1), Japanese (track 2), Italian (track 3), Swedish (track 4), French (track 5), Dutch (tracks 6 and 9), Danish (track 7), Spanish (track 8), Portuguese (track 10) and Russian (track 11, in the latter case as poetry of decent quality).

== Certifications ==
Region	Certification	Certified units/sales
France (SNEP)	Gold	100,000^{*}
Sweden (GLF)	Gold	50,000^{^}
^{*} Sales figures based on certification alone.^{^} Shipments figures based on certification alone.

== Release history ==
Region	Date	Ref.
Europe	September 7, 1992	
Japan	September 18, 1992	
United Kingdom	September 21, 1992	
United States	May 11, 1993	
