= Absolutely Live (Toto album) =

Live album by Toto
- Released: September 24, 1993
- Recorded: October 19, 1992
- Venue: Ahoy (Rotterdam)
- Genre: Progressive rock, pop rock
- Length: 82:56
- Label: Columbia
- Producer: James Guthrie, Alfred Lagarde, Toto

Toto chronology
Kingdom of Desire (1992)	Absolutely Live (1993)	Tambu (1995)

Professional ratings
Review scores
Source	Rating
AllMusic	2.5/5 stars

Absolutely Live is the first live album released by the band Toto in 1993, with backup vocalists Jenny Douglas-McRae, John James and Donna McDaniel joining lead singer Steve Lukather. Initially released in 1993, the album has been subsequently re-released in 1999 on Sony International. After the release of the album, the band went on a brief hiatus. The live album reached No. 23 on the Dutch Album Top 100.

== Track listing ==
Title	Writers	Length	Lead vocalist	Studio album
"Hydra"	David Paich, Steve Porcaro, Steve Lukather, Jeff Porcaro, David Hungate, Bobby Kimball	7:44	David Paich	Hydra
"Rosanna"	Paich	8:25	John James, Lukather	Toto IV
"Kingdom of Desire"	Danny Kortchmar	8:02	Lukather	Kingdom of Desire
"Georgy Porgy"	Paich	3:45	Lukather	Toto
"99"	Paich	3:01	Lukather	Hydra
"I Won't Hold You Back"	Lukather	2:09	Lukather	Toto IV
"Don't Stop Me Now"	Lukather, Paich	2:35	Instrumental	Fahrenheit
"Africa"	Paich, Jeff Porcaro	6:11	Paich	Toto IV
"Don't Chain My Heart"	Toto	7:21	Lukather	Kingdom of Desire
"I'll Be Over You"	Randy Goodrum, Lukather	5:38	Lukather	Fahrenheit
"Home of the Brave"	Lukather, Paich, Jimmy Webb, Joseph Williams	7:07	Donna McDaniel, Paich	The Seventh One
"Hold the Line"	Paich	10:44	Jenny Douglas-Foote, John James	Toto
"With a Little Help from My Friends"	Lennon–McCartney	10:08	Lukather	Live only cover song

== Personnel ==
=== Toto ===
- Steve Lukather – lead vocals, guitar
- David Paich – keyboards, vocals
- Mike Porcaro – bass guitar
- Simon Phillips – drums

=== Additional musicians ===
- John James– vocals
- Donna McDaniel– vocals
- Jenny Douglas-McRae – vocals
- John Jessel– additional keyboards, vocals, sound effects
- Chris Trujillo– percussion

=== Production ===
- Toto – producer
- Alfred Lagarde – producer
- Arnie Acosta – mastering
- Gina Zangla – art direction
- Sean O'Dwyer – assistant engineer
- James Guthrie – producer, mixing
- Ronald Tryber – engineer
- Ed Jansson – assistant engineer
- Max Rozenbeek – assistant engineer
- Joh Van Someren – assistant engineer
- Gert Vinke – assistant engineer
- Jack Anderson – photography
- Jens Schmidt – photography

== Charts ==
Chart (1993)	Peak position
Dutch Albums (Album Top 100)	23
German Albums (Offizielle Top 100)	76
Swedish Albums (Sverigetopplistan)	35

== Singles ==
- "Africa" / "Africa" (live) (released in France)
- "With a Little Help from My Friends" / "Rosanna" (live) (released in EU)
- "I'll Be Over You" / "99" (live) (released in NL)
