= I Will Remember =

Single by Toto

from the album Tambu
- B-side: "Dave's Gone Skiing"
- Released: September 18, 1995 (EU); November 6, 1995 (UK)
- Length: 4:18 (radio edit version) 4:30 (video version) 6:06 (album version)
- Label: Columbia (UK/EU); Legacy (US)
- Songwriters: Stan Lynch; Steve Lukather
- Producers: Elliott Scheiner; Toto

Toto singles chronology
"I'll Be Over You (Live)" (1993)	"I Will Remember" (1995)	"Drag Him to the Roof" (1995)

"I Will Remember" is a 1995 song performed by Toto from their album Tambu. The song was released as a single in Europe that same year to promote the album. Upon its release, "I Will Remember" reached the singles chart in several countries, including the UK, where it peaked number 64. Elsewhere, the song also charted in Germany and the Netherlands.

The pan-European magazine Music & Media wrote that the song "has everything going for it, most of all a melody that lingers on."

The song was written in tribute to Toto's original drummer, Jeff Porcaro, who died in 1992.

== Personnel ==
Toto

- Steve Lukather – lead and backing vocals, guitars, keyboards
- David Paich – piano, backing vocals, string conductor & arrangements
- Mike Porcaro – bass guitar
- Simon Phillips – drums

=== Additional personnel ===
- Lenny Castro – percussion
- Jenny Douglas-Foote – backing vocals
- John James – backing vocals
- Michael McDonald – backing vocals
- John Jessel – keyboard programming
- Shari Sutcliffe – strings contractor

== Charts ==
Chart (1995)	Peak position
European Adult Contemporary (Music & Media)	18
Germany (GfK)	82
Netherlands (Single Top 100)	41
Sweden (Sverigetopplistan)	29
UK Singles (Official Charts)	64
