= Livefields =

Live album by Toto
- Released: September 27, 1999
- Recorded: March 28, 1999
- Venue: Le Dôme (Marseille, France)
- Genre: Rock
- Length: 75:30 (standard edition); 20:48 (bonus disc incl. Child's Anthem)
- Label: Columbia
- Producer: Toto, Elliot Scheiner

Toto chronology
Mindfields (1999)	Livefields (1999)	Through the Looking Glass (2002)

Livefields is a live album by the band Toto. It was recorded during the reunion tour after the release of their album Mindfields, and released in late 1999. Outside the US, the album contained a second CD with 3 extra tracks, recorded during several concerts in France, as well as two video clips for "Melanie" and "Cruel."

== Track listing ==
=== Regular album ===
1. "Caught in the Balance" (Lukather, Paich, Phillips, Porcaro, Lynch, Kimball)
2. "Tale of a Man" (Paich)
3. "Rosanna" (Paich)
4. "[Luke Solo]" (Lukather)
5. "Million Miles Away" (Paich)
6. "Jake to the Bone" (Paich, Porcaro, Porcaro, Lukather)
7. "[Simon Solo]" (Phillips)
8. "Dave's Gone Skiing" (Lukather, Porcaro, Phillips)
9. "Out of Love" (Lukather, Byron)
10. "Mama" (Paich, Kimball)
11. "You Are the Flower" (Kimball)
12. "The Road Goes On" (Lukather, Paich, Ballard)
13. "Better World" (Lukather, Paich, Phillips)
14. "Girl Goodbye" (Paich)
15. "[Dave Solo]" (Paich)
16. "White Sister" (Paich, Kimball)

Note: Tracks 9–12 are part of a special acoustic set.

=== Bonus disc ===
1. "I Will Remember" (Lukather, Lynch)
2. "Hold the Line" (Paich)
3. "I Won't Hold You Back" (Lukather)
4. "Child's Anthem" (Paich)
5. "Melanie" (music video)
6. "Cruel" (live video)

Note: The song "Child's Anthem" was only available as a Japanese bonus track.

== Personnel ==
- Bobby Kimball – vocals
- Steve Lukather – guitars, vocals
- David Paich – keyboards, vocals
- Mike Porcaro – bass
- Simon Phillips – drums
- Tony Spinner – backing vocals, guitar
- Buddy Hyatt – backing vocals, percussion
- John Jessel – backing vocals, keyboards
