= In a Word (disambiguation) =

In a Word is a 2002 box set collection of music by the band Yes.

In a Word may also refer to:

- "In a Word", a song by Toto released as the B-side of the 1986 single "I'll Be Over You" (also later released on the 1998 compilation album Toto XX)

== See also ==
- In a World..., a 2013 American comedy film written, directed, starring, and co-produced by Lake Bell
- "In a World", song by Guy Sebastian from the 2020 album T.R.U.T.H.
