= Absolutely Live =

Absolutely Live may refer to:

- Absolutely Live (The Doors album)
- Absolutely Live (Rod Stewart album)
- Absolutely Live (Toto album)
