= Live in Amsterdam (Toto album) =

25th Anniversary: Live in Amsterdam

Live album by Toto
- Released: September 23, 2003
- Recorded: February 17, 2003
- Venue: Heineken Music Hall (Amsterdam)
- Genre: Progressive rock
- Length: 79:23 (CD); 103:39 (video formats)
- Label: Eagle
- Producer: Toto

Toto chronology
Through the Looking Glass (2002)	25th Anniversary: Live in Amsterdam (2003)	The Essential Toto (2003)

Professional ratings
Review scores
Source	Rating
AllMusic	3/5 stars

25th Anniversary: Live in Amsterdam is a live album by Toto, released in 2003, in the 25th anniversary of the band. It was also the band's last live album to feature bassist Mike Porcaro before his retirement from touring due to his diagnosis with ALS four years later and his death on March 15, 2015.

== Track listing ==
=== CD ===
All songs by David Paich, except where noted.

No.	Title	Writer(s)	Length
1.	"Girl Goodbye"		3:43
2.	"Goodbye Elenore"		1:53
3.	"Child's Anthem"		0:56
4.	"I'll Supply the Love"		1:20
5.	"Gift with a Golden Gun"	Paich, Bobby Kimball	4:48
6.	"While My Guitar Gently Weeps" (The Beatles cover)	George Harrison	5:44
7.	"Bodhisattva" (Steely Dan cover)	Walter Becker, Donald Fagen	4:54
8.	"Africa"	Paich, Jeff Porcaro	7:08
9.	"Waiting for Your Love"	Paich, Kimball	6:29
10.	"Georgy Porgy"		2:12
11.	"Lion"	Paich, Kimball	1:30
12.	"Hydra"	Steve Lukather, Paich, J. Porcaro, Kimball, Steve Porcaro, David Hungate	1:25
13.	"English Eyes"	Paich, J. Porcaro, Kimball, S. Porcaro	2:22
14.	"Till the End"	Paich, Williams	0:41
15.	"I Won't Hold You Back"	Lukather	5:26
16.	"Rosanna"		8:45
17.	"Afraid of Love"	Lukather, Paich, J. Porcaro	4:41
18.	"Hold the Line"		4:40
19.	"Home of the Brave"	Lukather, Paich, Willams, Jimmy Webb	8:11
Total length:			1:19:23

=== DVD/Blu-ray ===
All songs by David Paich, except where noted.

1. Medley:
  - "Girl Goodbye"
  - "Goodbye Elenore"
  - "Child's Anthem"
  - "I'll Supply the Love"
2. "Gift with a Golden Gun" (Bobby Kimball, Paich)
3. "While My Guitar Gently Weeps" (George Harrison)
4. "Bodhisattva" (Walter Becker, Donald Fagen)
5. "Africa"
6. "Keyboard Solo"
7. "Dune"
8. "Don't Stop Me Now" (Steve Lukather, Paich)
9. Medley: (Toto)
  - "Waiting for Your Love"
  - "Georgy Porgy"
  - "Lion"
  - "Hydra"
  - "English Eyes"
  - "Till the End"
10. "I Won't Hold You Back" (Lukather)
11. "Rosanna"
12. "Afraid of Love" (Lukather, Paich, Jeff Porcaro)
13. "Hold the Line"
14. "Next to You" (Norman Whitfield, Barrett Strong)
15. "Home of the Brave" (Lukather, Paich, Jimmy Webb, Joseph Williams)
16. "White Sister"

== Personnel ==
Toto

- Bobby Kimball – lead vocals, backing vocals
- Steve Lukather – guitars, backing vocals, additional lead vocals, keyboard solo on "Rosanna"
- David Paich – keyboards, backing vocals, additional lead vocals
- Mike Porcaro – bass
- Simon Phillips – drums

Additional musicians

- Tony Spinner – backing vocals, additional guitars
- John Jessel – auxiliary keyboards, samples, backing vocals

== Certifications ==
Certifications
Region	Certification	Certified units/sales
Argentina (CAPIF)	Platinum	40,000^{^}
Canada (Music Canada)	Gold	50,000^{^}
^{^} Shipments figures based on certification alone.
