= Through the Looking Glass (Toto album) =

Studio album by Toto
- Released: October 14, 2002
- Recorded: 2002
- Studios: Coy Sound (Sherman Oaks); A.T.S. (Calabasas)
- Genre: Pop
- Length: 55:40
- Labels: Capitol; EMI
- Producer: Toto

Toto chronology
Livefields (1999)	Through the Looking Glass (2002)	25th Anniversary: Live in Amsterdam (2003)

Through the Looking Glass is the eleventh studio album (though counted as the 12th album overall—see Toto XX) by the American band Toto. It was released in October 2002, three years after their last album, Mindfields. The album consists of cover versions of songs that had inspired the band.

== Reception ==
Professional ratings
Review scores
Source	Rating
AllMusic	2.5/5 stars
Blender	1/5 stars

AllMusic noted that Toto made no attempt to rework the songs they covered for the album, and concluded that "while it's nice to know that the band has good taste in other people's music, that doesn't explain why anyone needs to hear them copy that music when the originals are so readily available."

== Track listing ==
No.	Title	Writer(s)	Lead vocals	Length
1.	"Could You Be Loved"	Bob Marley	Kimball	3:47
2.	"Bodhisattva"	Walter Becker; Donald Fagen	Kimball; Lukather	4:51
3.	"While My Guitar Gently Weeps"	George Harrison	Lukather	5:15
4.	"I Can't Get Next to You"	Norman Whitfield; Barrett Strong	Kimball	4:04
5.	"Living for the City"	Stevie Wonder	Kimball	5:49
6.	"Maiden Voyage / Butterfly"	Herbie Hancock / Hancock; Bennie Maupin	instrumental	7:33
7.	"Burn Down the Mission"	Elton John; Bernie Taupin	Kimball	6:28
8.	"Sunshine of Your Love"	Jack Bruce; Eric Clapton; Pete Brown	Lukather	5:13
9.	"House of the Rising Sun"	traditional	Kimball	4:40
10.	"Watching the Detectives"	Elvis Costello	Lukather	4:04
11.	"It Takes a Lot to Laugh, It Takes a Train to Cry (Live)"	Bob Dylan	Paich	3:52

== Personnel ==
=== Toto ===
- Bobby Kimball – lead vocals (1, 2, 4, 5, 7, 9), backing vocals (1, 3, 4, 7), loops (11)
- Steve Lukather – guitars, lead vocals (2, 3, 8, 10), backing vocals (1, 3–5, 7, 8, 10), keyboards (8), dobro (11), loops (11)
- David Paich – keyboards (1–10), lead vocals (11), backing vocals (3, 4), piano (5–7, 11), Moog bass (5), Wurlitzer (11), loops (11)
- Mike Porcaro – bass, backing vocals (4), loops (11)
- Simon Phillips – drums, loops (1, 3, 5, 6, 8, 9, 11), tambourine (4), backing vocals (4), keyboards (6)

==== Additional musicians ====
- Lenny Castro – timbales (1, 10), percussion (3, 6, 10), congas (6, 7), tambourine (7)
- Steve Porcaro – synthesizer programming (2, 7), keyboards (3), synthesizer and sound effects (5)
- Brandon Fields – tenor saxophone (4, 6), alto saxophone (6), soprano saxophone (6)
- Walt Fowler – trumpet (4, 6), flugelhorn (6)
- James Ingram – backing vocals (1, 4), ad-libs (1, 4)
- Tippa Irie – DJ (1)
- Ellis Hall – vocals (5)
- Davey Johnstone – backing vocals (7)
- Nigel Olsson – backing vocals (7)
- Monét – backing vocals (8, 9, 11), ad-libs (11)

=== Technical ===
- Produced and arranged by Toto
- Engineered by Simon Phillips
- Mixed by Steve MacMillan (1–5, 7–11) and Simon Phillips (6)
- Assistant engineer – John Jessel
- Digitally edited by Louie Teran
- Mastered by Stephen Marcussen at Marcussen Mastering (Hollywood, CA)
- Creative director – Doug Brown
- Art direction and design – Brian Peterson
- Photography – Resig & Taylor
- Project coordination – Anita Heilig
- Management – The Fitzgerald Hartley Co.

== Singles ==
- Could You Be Loved / House of the Rising Sun
