= The Essential Toto =

2003 greatest hits album by Toto

Compilation album by Toto
- Released: September 30, 2003
- Recorded: 1978–1998
- Genre: Rock
- Length: 68:35
- Label: Columbia

Toto chronology
Live in Amsterdam (2003)	The Essential Toto (2003)	Falling in Between (2006)

Professional ratings
Review scores
Source	Rating
AMG	4.5/5 stars
ArtistDirect	4.5/5 stars

The Essential Toto is a greatest hits album by American rock band Toto. It was released in 2003 by Columbia, as part of the Essential series. Originally a single-disc compilation, a two-disc edition was released in 2004.

The single-disc compilation was re-released as Playlist: The Very Best of Toto on April 17, 2009.

== Track listing ==
=== Single-disc edition ===
1. "Hold the Line" – 3:56
2. "Rosanna" – 5:30
3. "Africa" – 4:58
4. "99" – 5:15
5. "Make Believe" – 3:43
6. "I'll Supply the Love" – 3:46
7. "Georgy Porgy" – 4:10
8. "I Won't Hold You Back" – 4:56
9. "I'll Be Over You" – 3:50
10. "Without Your Love" – 4:53
11. "Pamela" – 5:10
12. "The Turning Point" – 5:27
13. "Mindfields" – 6:13
14. "On the Run" (Live) – 6:59

=== Double-disc re-release ===
==== Disc 1 ====
1. "Rosanna" (single version) – 4:01
2. "Stop Loving You" – 4:28
3. "Hold the Line" (single version) – 3:31
4. "Caught In the Balance" – 6:21
5. "99" – 5:11
6. "The Other Side" – 4:39
7. "I Won't Hold You Back" – 4:56
8. "Africa" (single version) – 4:21
9. "Don't Chain My Heart" – 4:42
10. "2 Hearts" – 5:06
11. "Waiting for Your Love" – 4:12
12. "Make Believe" – 3:43
13. "Goodbye Elenore" – 4:53
14. "Home of the Brave" – 6:45
15. "How Does It Feel" – 3:50
16. "The Road Goes On" – 4:24

==== Disc 2 ====
1. "I Will Remember" – 4:22
2. "Georgy Porgy" – 4:08
3. "Just Can't Get to You" – 5:02
4. "Pamela" (single version) – 4:30
5. "Baby He's Your Man" – 5:40
6. "I'll Supply the Love" – 3:45
7. "Holyanna" – 4:15
8. "The Turning Point" (single version) – 4:03
9. "If You Belong to Me" – 3:58
10. "Can You Hear What I'm Saying" – 4:58
11. "Slipped Away" – 5:16
12. "Dave's Gone Skiing" – 4:59
13. "Without Your Love" (single version) – 4:29
14. "Stranger in Town" – 4:43
15. "Till the End" – 5:27
16. "I'll Be Over You" – 3:48
