= Bohemian Symphony Orchestra Prague =

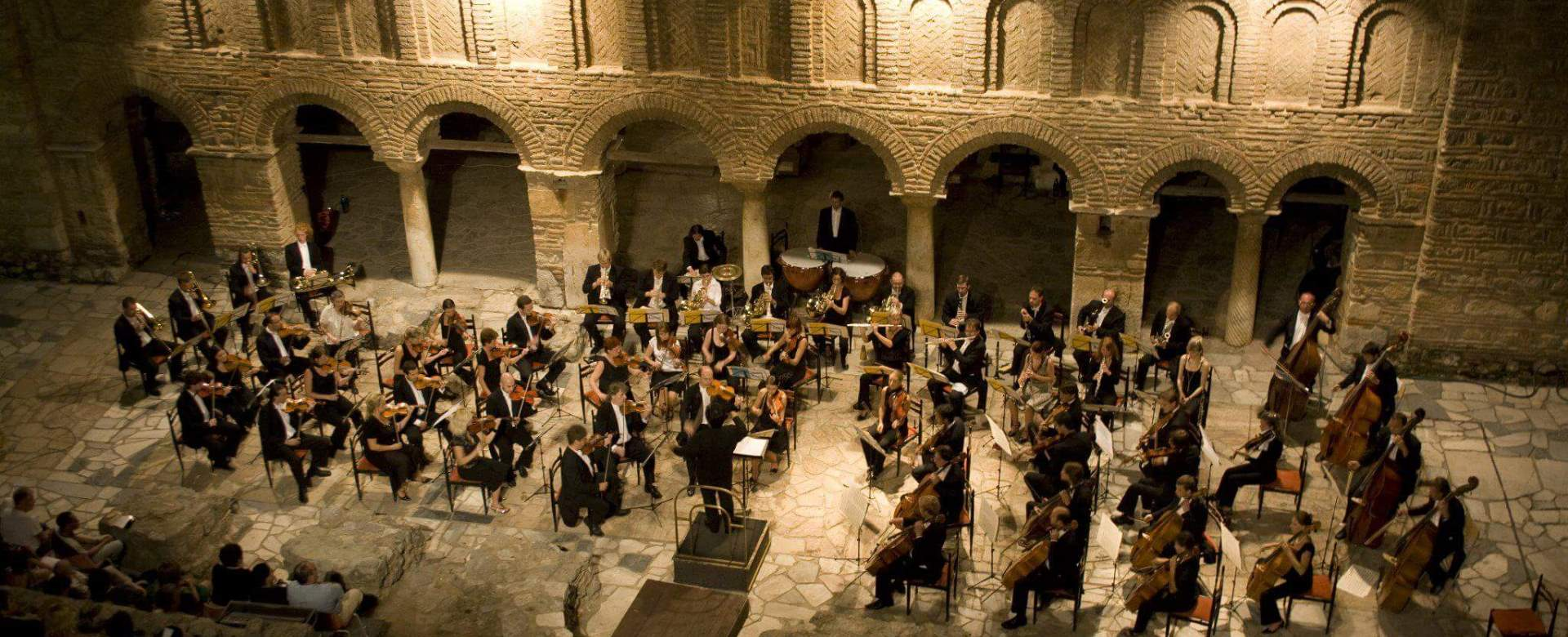
Bohemian Symphony Orchestra Prague

Bohemian Symphony Orchestra Prague is an orchestra based in Prague, Czech Republic.

== History ==
It was founded in 2000 by its chief conductor Martin Šanda and its basic formation consists of 70 musicians. Other conductors are David Lukáš and Martin Peschík.

Apart from a regular series of classic concerts in Czech and worldwide, in the series The Original Rock Meets Classic launched in 2010, the orchestra accompanied Alice Cooper, Joe Lynn Turner, Mick Box, Bernie Shaw, Kim Wilde, Paul Rodgers, Eric Bazilian, Steve Augeri, Chris Thompson, Bonnie Tyler, Ian Gillan, Steve Lukather, Jimi Jamison, Robin Beck, Dan McCafferty, Lou Gramm, Les Holroyd, Marc Storace, Bobby Kimball, Sabaton and more.

In the spring of 2016, the orchestra accompanied Vanessa Mae in Brno, Czech Republic, and Gianna Nannini in Verona, Italy.
