= Le Dôme de Marseille =

Coordinates: 43.315250°N 5.404450°E

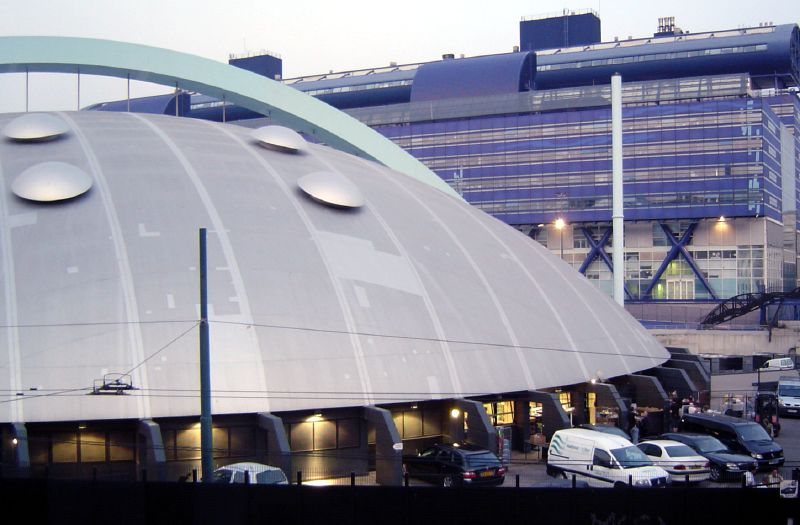
Le Dôme

Le Dôme de Marseille is an indoor amphitheatre, located in Marseille, France. The capacity of the arena is 8,500 people.

The amphitheatre has hosted concerts by many famous artists, spanning many different genres. Many international celebrities performed here notably in the 2000s, as Beyoncé, Rihanna and Oasis. Toto recorded their live album Livefields there in 1999.
