= Don't Chain My Heart =

1992 single by Toto

Single by Toto

from the album Kingdom of Desire
- B-side: "Jake to the Bone"
- Released: August 1992
- Recorded: August 19–20, 1991 (basic tracks)
- Studio: A&M Studios (Hollywood)
- Genre: Rock
- Length: 4:46
- Label: Columbia
- Songwriter: Steve Lukather
- Producer: Toto

Toto singles chronology
"Can You Hear What I'm Saying" (1990)	"Don't Chain My Heart" (1990)	"Only You" (1992)

Music video
- "Don't Chain My Heart" on YouTube

"Don't Chain My Heart" is a song recorded by the American rock band Toto. It was written by Steve Lukather and released as the first single from the band's eighth studio album, Kingdom of Desire. The song charted in several countries throughout Europe, including Norway and Sweden, where it reached the top ten.

Lukather said that most of the instrumentation on "Don't Chain My Heart" was tracked live in one day, including the rhythm tracks and the guitar solo.

Music & Media characterized "Don't Chain My Heart" as "stadium rock that will reach the upper decks."

== Charts ==
Chart (1992)	Peak position
Europe (European Hot 100 Singles)	49
European Airplay (Music & Media)	20
France (SNEP)	35
Netherlands (Single Top 100)	12
Norway (VG-lista)	8
Sweden (Sverigetopplistan)	9
Switzerland (Schweizer Hitparade)	38
