= Jackopierce =

American alternative rock band

- Origin: Dallas, Texas
- Genres: Alternative rock, Folk rock
- Years active: 1988–1997, 2002–present
- Labels: A&M
- Members: Jack O'Neill & Cary Pierce
- Website: http://www.jackopierce.com/

Jackopierce is an American alternative rock band formed by Jack O'Neill and Cary Pierce in Dallas, Texas in 1988. Their style is focused around vocal harmonies and acoustic guitars.

== History ==
Jack O'Neill and Cary Pierce founded the duo in 1988 while both were attending Southern Methodist University in Dallas as theater majors. The name of the band was made up from O'Neill's first name and Pierce's last name.

Over the next ten years Jackopierce toured extensively, mainly in the USA but also other countries. Over the years they have shared the stage with artists such as Dave Matthews Band, Counting Crows, The Wallflowers, Sheryl Crow, Jewel, Alanis Morissette and Semisonic. During that time, they sold over 400,000 records (four independent albums and two on A&M Records).

=== Breakup and solo work ===
Jackopierce ended their decade-long association in 1997 with a sold-out farewell tour and the release of Decade, a retrospective double-CD that included new and live material. The last show of the farewell tour was 31 December 1997.

After the breakup Jack O’Neill lived in New York performing as a member of the Bat Theater Company. In 1999 he released a self-titled EP with his band American Horse. Later he also released a solo CD entitled Halfway Around The World.

Cary Pierce started a solo career and continued to play across the United States. He released four solo records and created his own record label, Foreverything Records. Cary produced and co-wrote records for Graham Colton, Jack Ingram, Creede Williams and others.

=== The reunion ===
After a five-year breakup in 1997 the duo reconvened in 2002 as Jackopierce for a sold-out run of shows in TX. In May 2009, Jackopierce began a series of lifestyle events designed to take fans to some of their favorite destinations around the country for an intimate evening of food, music, and fun. The idea behind these events are to create "Trips of a Lifetime" with each show featuring a unique experience dedicated to the local culture. Tickets for such events include VIP dinner with the band, limited edition posters, access to special guest performances and more. In celebration of their 25th anniversary, Jackopierce created a destination events at the AT&T Winspear Opera in Dallas, TX with over 2,100 people in attendance. Past locations have included Asheville, NC, Aspen, CO, Martha's Vineyard, MA, Santa Barbara, CA, Sonoma, CA, and Austin, TX. In 2014, Jackopierce will have its first international destination show in San Miguel de Allende, Mexico.

A new studio CD, Promise of Summer, was released in September 2008 and several live albums were released in 2009 and 2010. Jackopierce followed this effort with Everywhere All The Time in 2012 and Feel This Good in 2018.

=== Members ===
- Jack O'Neill – vocals, guitars
- Cary Pierce – vocals, guitars
- Clay Pendergrass – bass, guitars (1995–1997)
- Earl Darling – drums (1995–1997)

== Discography ==
=== Albums ===
- 1990 – Jackopierce
- 1993 – Woman as Salvation
- 1994 – Live from the Americas
- 1994 – Bringing on the Weather
- 1996 – Finest Hour
- 1998 – Decade 1988-1998
- 2008 – Promise of Summer
- 2009 – Acoustic Summer
- 2009 – Live From Atlanta (live)
- 2010 – Mile High – Live from Soiled Dove in Denver (live)
- 2012 - Everywhere All The Time
- 2018 - Feel This Good

=== Singles ===
- 1994 – Anderson's Luck (Promo CD Single)
- 1994 – Live (Promo CD EP)
- 1994 – Get To Know Me Better (Promo CD Single)
- 1996 – Late Shift (Promo CD Single)
- 1996 – Trials (Promo CD Single)
- 1997 – Vineyard (Promo CD Single)
- 2010 – Summer's gone
