= Dune (1984 soundtrack) =

Soundtrack album by Toto
- Released: November 8, 1984
- Studios: The Villa (Los Angeles); Sunset Sound (Los Angeles); The Manor (Los Angeles); Austrophon Studio (Vienna)
- Genre: Symphonic rock
- Length: 41:38
- Label: Polydor
- Producers: Toto; Brian Eno

Toto chronology
Isolation (1984)	Dune (1984)	Fahrenheit (1986)

Audio sample
- "Dune Prophecy Theme": file; help

Professional ratings
Review scores
Source	Rating
AllMusic	4/5 stars
Filmtracks	3/5 stars

Dune is an original soundtrack album for the 1984 film Dune. Most of the album was composed by the rock band Toto (their first and only film score), with one track contributed by Brian Eno, Roger Eno and Daniel Lanois. The soundtrack album was first released on November 8, 1984. An extended version with an altered track listing was released in 1997. Both versions are currently out of print on traditional media, such as CD. However, with the growing popularity of digital downloads and streaming services, they have gained renewed exposure through platforms like iTunes and Spotify.

== Overview ==
The instrumental soundtrack was recorded by the band Toto (minus lead singer Fergie Frederiksen), accompanied by the Vienna Symphony Orchestra and the Vienna Volksoper Choir, conducted by Marty Paich, father of Toto keyboardist David Paich. "Prophecy Theme" was composed for the movie by Brian Eno, Roger Eno and Daniel Lanois.

The soundtrack was released by Polydor Records and contained select cues in their original film order, plus two pieces of dialogue from the movie that served as bookends for two tracks ("Prologue" and "The Floating Fat Man (The Baron)"). It includes an alternative take of the "Main Title", that had not been used in the film.

An extended version of the album containing additional cues was released in 1997 on CD by PEG Records, an independent label division of Polygram. On this issue multiple tracks had mastering problems which resulted in audible distortion in the form of a 'wobbling' effect. Furthermore, many cues (particularly in the second half of the expanded CD) were mislabeled and placed out of film order. The reissue includes the film version of the "Main Title", and an original demo of the main title music.

There are several differences between the music on the two soundtrack albums and that heard in the film. For example, the end title theme, "Take My Hand", is heard on the soundtrack CDs minus the orchestration heard in the final film mix. The version of "Robot Fight" on the original soundtrack is heard in the theatrical version, while the version on the expanded CD is only heard in the extended "Alan Smithee" TV version of the film. The cues "Riding the Sandworm" (from the expanded CD) and "Dune (Desert Theme)", "Prelude (Take My Hand)", "Paul Kills Feyd" and "Final Dream" (from both soundtrack issues) are not heard in the movie, and are replaced by either repeated or alternate cues. However, the television version does restore "Paul Kills Feyd" in its original place in the movie, and "Dune (Desert Theme)", which was intended as the end title music, is replaced by "Take My Hand."

A remastered version of the 1997 reissue was released in 2001. Both featured identical packaging and a note from David Paich about the scoring process. In 2020, Jackpot Records re-released Dune with a limited "spice-colored" vinyl edition.

Composer James Newton Howard made his film score debut on the film, co-composing the cue "Trip to Arrakis" with Paich.

== Track listing ==
Side one
No.	Title	Writer(s)	Length
1.	"Prologue"	David Paich; David Lynch	1:47
2.	"Main Title"	D. Paich	1:15
3.	"Robot Fight"	Jeff Porcaro; Mike Porcaro; Steve Porcaro	1:18
4.	"Leto's Theme"	D. Paich	1:43
5.	"The Box"	D. Paich; Marty Paich	2:37
6.	"The Floating Fat Man (The Baron)"	D. Paich; J. Porcaro	1:24
7.	"Trip to Arrakis"	D. Paich; James Newton Howard	2:35
8.	"First Attack"	D. Paich; J. Porcaro; Steve Lukather	2:43
9.	"Prophecy Theme"	Brian Eno; Daniel Lanois; Roger Eno	4:19

Side two
No.	Title	Writer(s)	Length
10.	"Dune (Desert Theme)"	D. Paich; J. Porcaro; S. Porcaro; M. Porcaro; Lukather	5:30
11.	"Paul Meets Chani"	D. Paich	3:04
12.	"Prelude (Take My Hand)"	D. Paich; J. Porcaro	0:59
13.	"Paul Takes the Water of Life"	D. Paich; J. Porcaro; Lukather	2:48
14.	"Big Battle"	D. Paich; J. Porcaro	3:06
15.	"Paul Kills Feyd"	D. Paich; J. Porcaro; S. Porcaro	1:51
16.	"Final Dream"	D. Paich	1:25
17.	"Take My Hand"	D. Paich; J. Porcaro	2:35
Total length:			40:59

=== 1997 CD reissue ===
This release includes previously unreleased cues from the movie and features a different track list order. All tracks are written, composed and performed by Toto.

Unreleased tracks
No.	Title	Length
1.	"Guild Report"	0:55
2.	"House Atreides"	1:44
3.	"Paul Atreides"	2:22
4.	"Departure"	1:14
5.	"Sandworm Attack"	2:52
6.	"The Betrayal/Shields Down"	4:31
7.	"The Duke's Death"	2:06
8.	"Sandworm Chase"	2:39
9.	"The Fremen"	3:08
10.	"Secrets of the Fremen"	2:25
11.	"Destiny"	2:57
12.	"Riding the Sandworm"	1:27
13.	"Reunion With Gurney"	1:42
14.	"The Sleeper Has Awakened!"	3:24
15.	"Dune Main Title - Demo Version"	1:25

== Personnel ==
Adapted from the album's liner notes.

=== Toto ===
- Steve Lukather – guitars
- David Paich – piano, keyboards, synthesizers
- Steve Porcaro – keyboards, synthesizers
- Mike Porcaro – electric bass, acoustic bass, percussion
- Jeff Porcaro – drums, percussion

==== Additional musicians ====
- Joe Porcaro – percussion
- Emil Richards – percussion
- Robert Zimmitti – percussion
- Marty Paich – adaptation, additional music, conductor
- Allyn Ferguson – additional orchestration, conductor
- The Vienna Symphony Orchestra – orchestra
- The Vienna Volksoper Choir – choir
- Dieter von Ostheim – concertmaster

=== Technical ===
- Produced Toto (1–8, 10–17) and Brian Eno (9)
- Engineered by Tom Knox, Shep Lonsdale, Al Schmitt, Tom Fletcher, and Geoff Workman
- Second engineers (at Sunset Sound) – Brent Averill and Bill Jackson
- Orchestra engineered by Oswald Gritch and Franz Pusch at Austrophon Studio (Vienna, Austria)
- Mastered by The Mastering Lab (Hollywood, CA)
- Executive producer – Gilbert Marouani
- Management – The Fitzgerald Hartley Co.

==== 1997 CD reissue ====
- Main digital transfer – John Jessel
- Digitally mastered by James Nelson at Digital Sound
- Art direction – Mark Banning
