= Tambu (album) =

Studio album by Toto
- Released: September 29, 1995 (EU)
- Recorded: 1995
- Studio: Capitol (Hollywood)
- Genres: Hard rock; soft rock; R&B
- Length: 70:07
- Labels: Columbia (Europe); Sony (Japan); Legacy (US)
- Producers: Toto; Elliot Scheiner

Toto chronology
Kingdom of Desire (1992)	Tambu (1995)	Toto XX (1998)

Singles from Tambu
- 1. "I Will Remember" Released: September 1995; 2. "Drag Him To The Roof" Released: 1995 (Japan); 3. "The Other End Of Time" Released: 1995 (EU); 4. "Just Can't Get To You" Released: 1995 (EU); 5. "The Turning Point" Released: 1996 (EU); 6. "If You Belong To Me" Released: 1996 (EU)

Tambu is the ninth studio album by American rock band Toto. It was released in 1995 through Sony Records. Tambu has sold 600,000 copies worldwide. It is the band's first album to feature Simon Phillips following Jeff Porcaro's death in 1992. The album includes the single "I Will Remember", which failed to chart in the US but became the band's first chart hit in the UK since "I Won't Hold You Back" twelve years before.

Tambu was a nominee for Grammy Award for Best Engineered Album, Non-Classical in 1997.

== Reception ==
Professional ratings
Review scores
Source	Rating
AllMusic	2/5 stars

AllMusic's review reflected on the album as a major change of direction for Toto, commenting on the anguished and highly vague philosophical lyrics and the focused, bluesy musical style. They found Steve Lukather's performance as chief lead vocalist of such quality that it was puzzling why he hadn't been given the role earlier, and concluded "You couldn't call the result accomplished, but Tambu suggested that Toto was embarked on a new personal and musical journey that might lead in an interesting direction."

The Absolute Sound called the album "brilliant" and "near-perfect", saying that it was better than the band's previous works.

== Track listing ==
All tracks are written by Steve Lukather, with additional writers noted.

No.	Title	Writer(s)	Length
1.	"Gift of Faith"	David Paich, Stan Lynch	7:23
2.	"I Will Remember"	Lynch	6:06
3.	"Slipped Away"	Paich, Lynch, Simon Phillips, Mike Porcaro	5:16
4.	"If You Belong to Me"	Paich, Lynch	5:03
5.	"Baby He's Your Man"	Paich, Siedah Garrett	5:40
6.	"The Other End of Time"	Randy Goodrum	5:04
7.	"The Turning Point"	Paich, Lynch, Phillips, M. Porcaro	5:25
8.	"Time is the Enemy"	Paich, Fee Waybill	5:40
9.	"Drag Him to the Roof"	Paich, Lynch	6:10
10.	"Just Can't Get to You"	Paich, Glen Ballard	5:03
11.	"Dave's Gone Skiing" (instrumental)	Phillips, M. Porcaro	4:59
12.	"The Road Goes On"	Paich, Ballard	4:26

Japanese edition bonus track
No.	Title	Writer(s)	Length
13.	"Blackeye"	Paich, Jenny Douglas-McRae	3:53

== Personnel ==
Adapted from album's liner notes.

Toto

- Steve Lukather – guitars, lead vocals (1–10, 12), backing vocals (1–5, 7–10, 12), bass fills (5), acoustic piano (2, 6, 10), synthesizers (2, 6), mandolin (12), shaker (13)
- David Paich – acoustic piano (1–5, 7–9, 11–13), synthesizers (1, 3–13), string arrangements and conductor (2, 4, 10, 12), Rhodes (5, 7, 10), Hammond B-3 organ (5, 7, 10), backing vocals (5, 7), lead vocals (7, 9)
- Mike Porcaro – bass, additional keyboards (7)
- Simon Phillips – drums, drum loops (5), Roland TR-808 (6), additional keyboards (7)

Additional musicians

- Lenny Castro – percussion (1, 2, 6)
- Michael Fisher – percussion (4)
- Paulinho da Costa – percussion (5, 7, 8)
- Steve Porcaro – drum loops (5)
- Jenny Douglas-Foote – lead vocals (5, 7, 9, 13), backing vocals (1–5, 7–10, 12)
- John James – lead vocals (9), backing vocals (2, 5, 7, 8)
- Phillip Ingram – backing vocals (5, 7, 9)
- Ricky Nelson – backing vocals (5, 7)
- Jim Giddens, Steve Lukather, Stan Lynch, Mike Porcaro and Elliot Scheiner – S.P. chant (1)
- Bill Smith – Cockney lady (13)

=== Technical ===
- Produced by Elliot Scheiner and Toto
- Recorded by Elliot Scheiner, Al Schmitt, and Bill Smith
- Mixed by Elliot Scheiner
- Additional recording by John Jessel
- Assisted by Jim Giddens, Stephen Genewick, and Sean Schimmiel
- Digital editing and mastering by Ted Jensen at Sterling Sound (New York, NY)
- Creative direction – Doug Brown
- Art direction – Eric Scott
- Cover illustration and portraiture – Daniel Brereton
- Photography – Melodie Lawrence
- Production coordinator – Ivy Skoff
- Keyboard programming and set-up – John Jessel
- Set-up for David Paich and Mike Porcaro – Paul Jamieson
- Guitar tech – Gavin Menzies
- Cartage for Steve Lukather – Andy Brauer Studio Rentals
- Piano tuner – Keith Albright
- Set-up for Simon Phillips – Drum Paradise
- String contractor – Shari Sutcliffe
- Management – The Fitzgerald Hartley Co.

== Additional notes ==
Catalogue: (CD) Sony Legacy 64957

== Singles ==
- I Will Remember / Dave's Gone Skiing (released in UK and EU)
- Drag Him to the Roof / I Will Remember (released in Japan)
- The Other End of Time / Slipped Away (released in EU)
- Just Can't Get to You / I'll Be Over You (released in EU)
- The Turning Point / The Road Goes On (released in EU)
- If You Belong to Me / Don't Stop Me Now (released in EU)

== Release history ==
Region	Date	Ref.
Europe	September 29, 1995	
United Kingdom	October 9, 1995	
Japan	October 13, 1995	
United States	June 4, 1996	
