= Mindfields =

Studio album by Toto
- Released: (Europe) (Japan) March 1999 (United States) November 16, 1999
- Recorded: August 10, 1998 – January 1999
- Studios: Royaltone Studios (North Hollywood); ATS Studios (Calabasas); Hollywood Sound Recorders (Hollywood)
- Genres: Pop rock, jazz rock
- Length: 79:37
- Labels: Columbia (EU); Legacy (US)
- Producers: Toto, Elliot Scheiner

Toto chronology
Toto XX (1998)	Mindfields (1999)	Livefields (1999)

Singles from Mindfields
- 1. "Melanie" Released: April 1999

Mindfields is the tenth studio album (though counted as the 11th album overall — see Toto XX) by the American rock band Toto. It was released in Europe and Japan in March 1999, followed by a US release on November 16, 1999. Mindfields saw the return of vocalist Bobby Kimball, who had departed the band in 1984 during recording sessions for the Isolation album.

== Recording ==
The band began recording the album on August 10, 1998. This came after a reunion tour with former lead singers Bobby Kimball and Joseph Williams earlier that year to celebrate their 20th anniversary and Toto XX album. Although the band decided on Kimball, Williams did contribute as co-writer of the song "Mad About You". As of December 3, 1998, the album was being mixed and the cover art was being designed. Release dates were also set but pushed back as they grew closer. The album was eventually released across Europe beginning the first week of March 1999.

== Reception ==
Professional ratings
Review scores
Source	Rating
AllMusic	1.5/5 stars
Q	3/5 stars

The album received mixed reviews from critics. Michael Gallucci of AllMusic wrote: "Overlong, overwrought, and devoid of personality, this incredibly dull world-view update of Toto's crassly professional sound manages to pillage several cultures at once without contributing a single song worth remembering. The playing is tight—as you would expect from a bunch of studio session musicians—but all the skills in the world can't liven these 14 plodding tracks."

== Track listing ==
=== 1999 Release ===
No.	Title	Writer(s)	Lead Vocals	Length
1.	"After You've Gone"	Steve Lukather; Phil Soussan	Steve Lukather	6:37
2.	"Mysterious Ways"	Lukather; David Paich; Dean Grakal; Mark Hudson	Bobby Kimball; Lukather	3:42
3.	"Mindfields"	Lukather; Paich; Bobby Kimball; Mike Porcaro; Simon Phillips	Kimball	6:04
4.	"High Price of Hate" (^{1})	Lukather; Paich; Porcaro; Phillips; Stan Lynch	Kimball	9:22^{1}
5.	"Selfish"	Lukather; Paich; Lynch	Kimball	5:30
6.	"No Love"	Lukather; Paich; Randy Goodrum	Lukather	4:34
7.	"Caught in the Balance"	Lukather; Paich; Kimball; Porcaro; Phillips; Lynch	Kimball	6:21
8.	"Last Love"	Lukather; Paich	Lukather	4:58
9.	"Mad About You"	Paich; Joseph Williams	Kimball	4:24
10.	"One Road"	Lukather; Paich; Goodrum	Kimball	3:45
11.	"Melanie"	Lukather; Paich; Goodrum	Lukather	5:19
12.	"Cruel"	Lukather; Kimball; Phillips; Jed Leiber	Kimball	5:57
13.	"Better World (Parts I, II & III)"	Lukather; Paich; Phillips	Lukather	7:50
Total length:				74:42

=== 1999 Bonus Tracks ===
No.	Title	Writer(s)	Lead Vocals	Length
14.	"Spanish Steps of Rome" (^{2})	Lukather; Paich	Paich	4:28
Total length:				79:10

^{1} On some copies of the album, a longer version of "High Price of Hate" was used with a length of 9:49.

=== 2018 All In Remaster ===
No.	Title	Writer(s)	Lead Vocals	Length
1.	"Cruel" (^{3})	Lukather; Kimball; Phillips; Jed Leiber	Bobby Kimball	5:55
2.	"Mysterious Ways"	Lukather; David Paich; Dean Grakal; Mark Hudson	Kimball; Lukather	3:40
3.	"Mindfields"	Lukather; Paich; Bobby Kimball; Mike Porcaro; Simon Phillips	Kimball	6:03
4.	"High Price of Hate"	Lukather; Paich; Porcaro; Phillips; Stan Lynch	Kimball	9:49
5.	"Selfish"	Lukather; Paich; Lynch	Kimball	5:31
6.	"No Love"	Lukather; Paich; Randy Goodrum	Lukather	4:36
7.	"Caught In The Balance"	Lukather; Paich; Kimball; Porcaro; Phillips; Lynch	Kimball	6:21
8.	"Last Love"	Lukather; Paich	Lukather	5:00
9.	"Mad About You"	Paich; Joseph Williams	Kimball	4:26
10.	"One Road"	Lukather; Paich; Goodrum	Kimball	3:48
11.	"Melanie"	Lukather; Paich; Goodrum	Lukather	5:21
12.	"After You've Gone" (^{3})	Lukather; Phil Soussan	Lukather	6:38
13.	"Better World" (^{4})	Lukather; Paich; Phillips	Lukather	7:41
14.	"Spanish Steps" (^{5})	Lukather; Paich	David Paich	4:28
Total length:				79:37

^{3} Track 1 ("Cruel") and 12 ("After You've Gone") switched places
^{4} Track 13 ("Better World") was originally titled "Better World (Parts I, II and III)"
^{5} Track 14 ("Spanish Steps") was originally titled "Spanish Steps of Rome"

== Personnel ==
Adapted from album's liner notes.

=== Toto ===
- Bobby Kimball – lead vocals (2–5, 7, 9, 10, 12), backing vocals (3, 4, 8–10, 12, 13)
- Steve Lukather – guitars, lead vocals (1, 2, 6, 8, 11, 13), backing vocals (1, 4, 6, 8, 10–14)
- David Paich – keyboards, horn arrangements (2, 5), backing vocals (3, 8), slide guitar solo (5), lead vocals (14)
- Mike Porcaro – bass, cello (1)
- Simon Phillips – drums, tabla (1), percussion (5, 6, 8, 10, 13), loops (11), backing vocals (13)

==== Guest musicians ====
- Steve Porcaro – keyboards (7, 11)
- Clint Black – harmonica and backing vocals (6)
- Lenny Castro – percussion (1–3, 9, 11, 13–14)
- Jim Horn – horns (2, 5, 12)
- Tom Scott – horns (2, 5, 12), horn arrangements (12)
- Bill Reichenbach Jr. – horns (2, 5, 12)
- Chuck Findley – horns (2, 5, 12)
- Gary Grant – horns (2, 5, 12)
- Mark Hudson – backing vocals (1, 2, 5)
- Timothy B. Schmit – backing vocals (1, 2, 5, 11)
- Phil Soussan – backing vocals (1)
- Richard Page – backing vocals (3, 7, 9, 12)
- Chris Thompson – backing vocals (6, 8, 10, 11, 13)
- Maria Vidal – backing vocals (14)

=== Production ===
- Produced by Toto and Elliot Scheiner
- Recorded by Elliot Scheiner, Steve MacMillan, Jess Sutcliffe, and Al Schmitt
- Mixed by Elliot Scheiner at Capitol Studios (Hollywood, CA)
- Mastered and sequenced by Ted Jensen at Sterling Sound (New York, NY)
- Pro Tools editing and recording – Steve MacMillan
- Second engineers – Jeff Thomas, Chad DeCinces, Steve Genewick, Charles Paakari, Eric Cowden, and Brian Davis
- Studio guitar technician – Gavin Menzies
- Keyboard technician – Gavin Menzies
- Copyist – Dan Ferguson
- Production coordination – Shari Sutcliffe
- Album design – WorldWest Communications
- Creative direction – Doug Brown
- Art direction, design, and illustration – Brian Peterson
- Band and cover photography – Melodie Lawrence
- Package coordiation – Lori Peterson

== Singles ==
- Melanie / Spanish Steps Of Rome
