= Stan Lynch =

American drummer (born 1955)

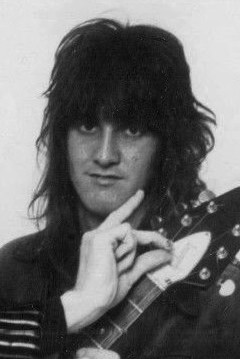
- Lynch in 1977

Background information
- Born: May 21, 1955 (age 71); Cincinnati, Ohio, United States
- Occupations: Songwriter; record producer; musician
- Instruments: Drums; guitar; piano; vocals

Stanley Joseph Lynch (born May 21, 1955) is an American musician, songwriter and record producer. He was the original drummer for Tom Petty and the Heartbreakers for 18 years until his departure in 1994.

== Early years ==
Lynch was born in Cincinnati, Ohio, and moved to Gainesville, Florida, in the early 1960s. He began playing music as a small child. As a teenager growing up near Gainesville, Lynch determined that he would find a way to make a living with music. "As a kid I had very little opportunity. I was a marginal student. I wasn't going to college. My parents didn't have money."

"I played guitar and piano, and I always thought I was going to be a guitar player," said Lynch. "The drums were sort of a happy accident. I didn't really think that they would be my ticket out of the ghetto. Choosing to be a musician back then was not like choosing a job, but an entire lifestyle. My father looked at me as if I were going to wear a dress and dance in the circus."

Lynch was always involved in fights at school; as such, his friends reasoned that the high-strung youth might be able to rip the aggression with drums. His parents made him take lessons before they bought him a kit. Lynch recalls with a laugh, "as soon as I got my first set they took up tennis—they just split, and I don't blame them."

== The Heartbreakers ==
Lynch started to work with various Florida bands, among them Styrophoam Soule and Road Turkey, and when he was 15 he met Ron Blair, who was six years older than Lynch. "I remember he accused me of stealing an amp from him. Hell, I didn't steal it. I was roadieing for him!" Drums did not absorb all of Lynch's feistiness as his parents had hoped, although he stayed in school long enough to graduate from P.K. Yonge School in 1973.

Lynch moved to Los Angeles, and hooked up again with Blair, during a recording session set up by Benmont Tench in 1976. The session also included Mike Campbell. Tench called Tom Petty, also from Gainesville, to ask for some help with some vocals. While they were taking a break Petty looked into the recording studio and thought to himself "this should be my band". Petty had come out to Los Angeles with his band Mudcrutch, which Tench and Campbell were originally a part of, and had a recording contract. But once in Los Angeles the producers decided they were not keen on the rest of the band, so it broke up, leaving Petty basically a solo act—something he was not happy about. But because he had the record deal already, after the break Petty went back into the studio and started his pitch. By the end of the evening, Lynch and the rest walked out as Tom Petty and The Heartbreakers.

Once with the Heartbreakers, Lynch calmed down. "Tom told me, 'Look man, you can call anybody anything you want...but you can't lay a hand on anyone in this band.'" Even though he was still in the band in 1989, Lynch did not perform on any songs on Petty's solo album Full Moon Fever, even though Campbell, Tench and Howie Epstein did.

For his part, Lynch felt that he had just begun to play well on the band's fourth and fifth albums, Hard Promises and Long After Dark. "[I'd] gotten looser, more pliable over the years," he commented. "When I listen to our first couple of albums, I think that I sound stiff." As Lynch's ability increased, so did the offers to play with other artists, creating experience that covers a wide variety of musical territory. Lynch contributed to albums by the following artists:

- The Amazing Delores
- The Blasters
- Jackson Browne
- T-Bone Burnett
- The Byrds
- Belinda Carlisle
- Bob Dylan
- The Eagles
- Elliot Easton
- Eurythmics
- Aretha Franklin
- Don Henley
- Jackopierce
- Freedy Johnston
- Jim Lauderdale
- Eric Martin
- The Mavericks
- John Mellencamp
- Roger McGuinn
- Kevin Montgomery
- Scotty Moore
- Stevie Nicks
- The Nudes
- Rank and File
- Timothy B. Schmit
- Del Shannon
- Todd Sharp
- Henry Lee Summer
- Toto
- Warren Zevon

== Departure from the Heartbreakers ==
During his last few years with the Heartbreakers, Lynch expressed displeasure with playing drums in concert on tracks from Petty's solo albums, as he did not play on the studio recordings. After several months of mounting tensions, he left the group immediately after his last Heartbreakers gig on October 2, 1994, at the Bridge School Benefit Concert in Mountain View, California. After his departure, Lynch moved back to Florida, where he partnered with longtime friend Don Henley to help put together the Eagles' reunion album Hell Freezes Over. He also has toured with the Eagles.

Acts Lynch has produced include The Band, the Eagles, Don Henley, Jackopierce, Joe 90, Scotty Moore, and Sister Hazel.

As a songwriter, he has co-written with or written for numerous acts, including Matraca Berg, Meredith Brooks, the Fabulous Thunderbirds, the Jeff Healey Band, June Pointer, Eddie Money, Toto, Tora Tora, Sister Hazel, Ringo Starr, and Don Henley.

Tim McGraw recorded "Back When", a song Lynch wrote with Stephony Smith and Jeff Stevens, for his album Live Like You Were Dying (2004).

Lynch reunited with his former bandmates in 2002 when they were inducted into the Rock and Roll Hall of Fame.

Tom Petty had the following to say about Lynch, included in his 2005 book, Conversations with Tom Petty:

Stan was a little younger than us. But he was a very good drummer and he was really conscientious, and he worked really hard. And he sang as well. He sang harmony. He was like our main harmony singer in the days before Howie. He was a powerhouse onstage. He reminded me sort of [like] Keith Moon in a way. He was so powerful I used to say he had this fifth gear that he could go into and just really make everything explode. He was really good at that, and he knew the songs really well. He and I had incredibly good communication onstage; he could read the movement of my shoulder. He could go anywhere I wanted to go. He never took his eyes off me. Anything I did was accented on the drums. Any movement I made. We had great eye communication where I could turn around and look at him, and he knew just exactly what I wanted to do.

In 2022, Lynch accepted an invitation from Heartbreakers guitarist Mike Campbell to fill in for drummer Matt Laug for several shows on tour with Campbell's band the Dirty Knobs. The two had not met or spoken in twenty years, other than a brief phone call following Petty's death. Lynch stated he would be open to playing with the other three original members of the Heartbreakers in the future.

Lynch has also worked extensively as a lyricist, including a long-running collaboration with Toto guitarist Steve Lukather. After contributing to Toto albums including Kingdom of Desire and Tambu, Lynch continued writing with Lukather on his solo work. On Lukather's 2023 album Bridges, Lynch co-wrote several songs and wrote the lyrics for "Not My Kind of People". Lukather described Lynch as "Stan, the word man", saying "He’s the one that comes up with these insane biting lyrics", and praising his ability to write lyrics that were "humorous and dark and weird".

== Personal life ==
Lynch was involved in a five-year relationship with actress Louise "Wish" Foley whom he met while he and the rest of the band were on set shooting a production for the Tom Petty song "Don't Come Around Here No More". Foley played the main blond haired Alice in Wonderland character in the video.
