= Bobby Kimball =

American singer (born 1947)

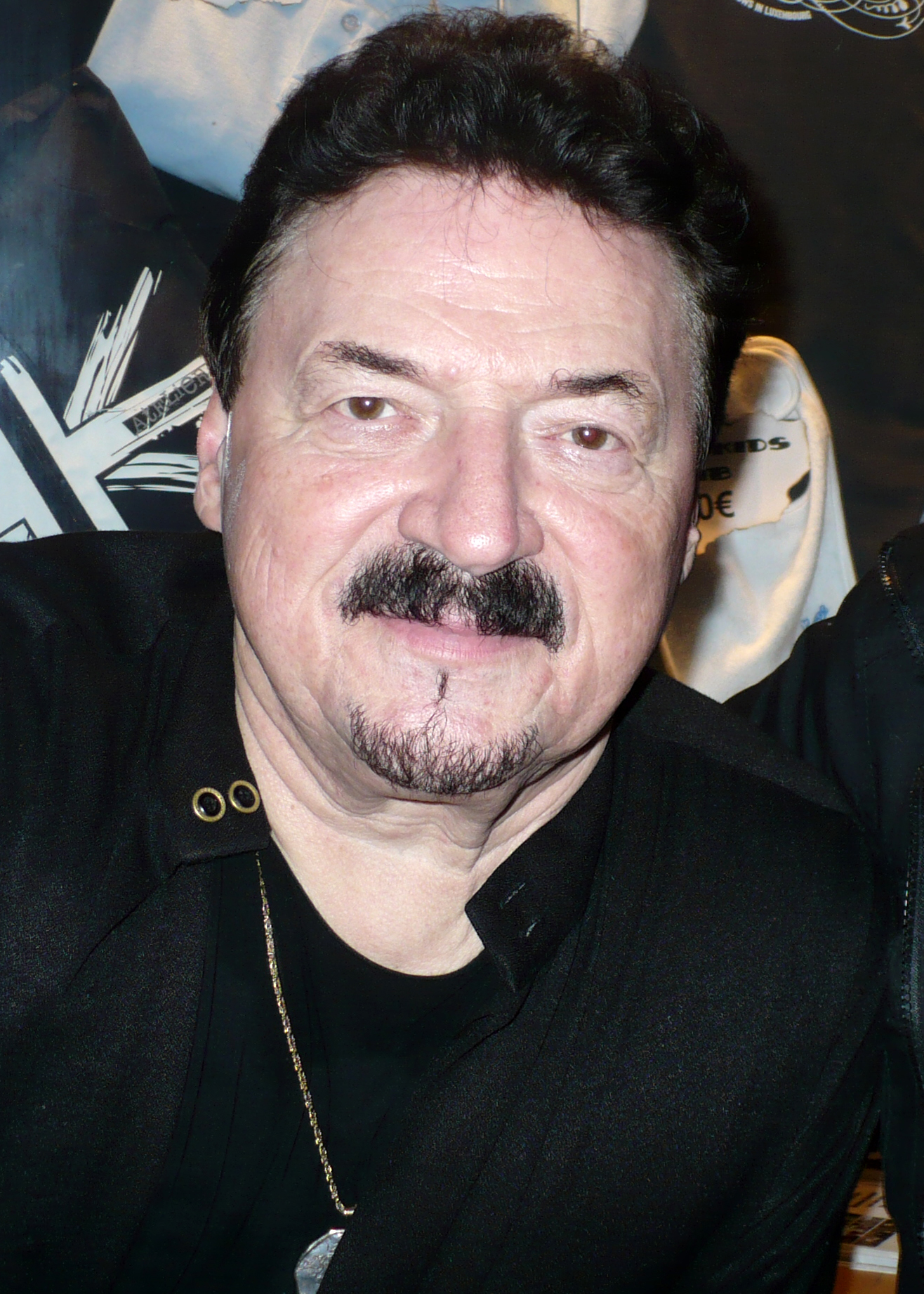
- Kimball in 2010

Background information
- Born: Robert Troy Kimball; March 29, 1947 (age 79); Orange, Texas, U.S.
- Origin: Vinton, Louisiana, U.S.
- Genres: Rock, pop, hard rock, soft rock, pop rock, yacht rock, blues
- Occupations: Singer; songwriter; musician
- Instruments: Vocals; keyboards
- Years active: 1962–2022
- Formerly of: Toto
- Spouse: Jasmin Gabay (m. 1996)
- Website: bobbykimball.com

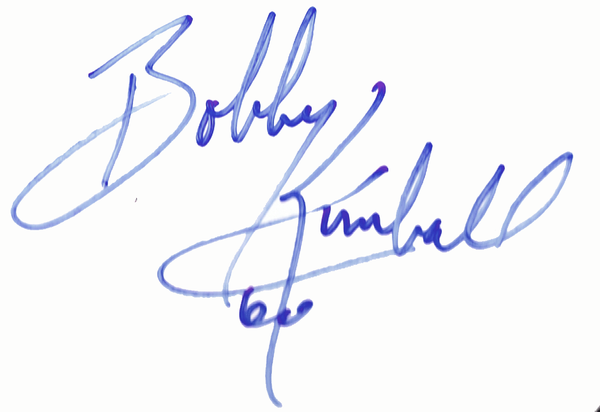
Bobby Kimball's signature

Robert Troy Kimball (born March 29, 1947) is an American retired singer and musician, best known as the original frontman of the rock band Toto from 1977 to 1984 and again from 1998 to 2008. He has also performed as a solo artist and session singer.

== History ==
=== Early life ===
Kimball was raised in Vinton, Louisiana, but born in nearby Orange, Texas, as Vinton did not have a hospital. He started singing as a child, dabbling on vocals and playing piano and acoustic guitar in a musical household throughout his youth, mostly covering and performing 1950s and 1960s R&B hits, 1800s traditional old-time music, and rare local swamp pop and Cajun folk songs typical of Louisiana.

His parents were extremely supportive of his musical talents, devoting themselves to his desire to become a full-time professional musician as an adult. He is of English, German, Irish, and Cajun French ancestry. He graduated from McNeese State University in Lake Charles, Louisiana, in 1969.

Throughout the 1970s, Kimball performed as the vocalist in various New Orleans-area bands, including the Levee Band, which became Louisiana's LeRoux after Kimball left.

=== Career success ===
In 1974, Kimball moved from Louisiana to Los Angeles, California, to pursue a full-time music career. In California, he joined three members of Three Dog Night, Floyd Sneed, Joe Schermie, and Michael Allsup, to form a band called S.S. Fools. They released one album on CBS Records, which was considered a commercial failure, causing the band to be dropped from their label and to split up within a year and a half. In 1976, David Paich and Jeff Porcaro asked Kimball to join them with three other session musicians, who would eventually form Toto. He submitted a self-penned audition song for the band, "You Are the Flower", which he had written for his daughter and was later included on Toto's debut album. Paich and Porcaro were impressed by Kimball's bluesy vocal style and offered him the job of vocalist and songwriter. The pair liked Kimball's ability to sing in an R&B style and to fuse it with hard rock and jazz, which was characteristic and attributed to his Louisiana origins.

Kimball performed on the first four studio albums by Toto. He was asked to leave the band in 1984 during the sessions for the Isolation album. In the late 1990s, on good terms with his former bandmates, Kimball was asked to rejoin Toto, which he accepted.

=== After Toto ===
In the 1984 movie Gimme an F, Kimball sang lead vocals on the song "State of My Heart". After splitting from Toto in 1984, he relocated to Germany. Under producer Frank Farian, he became a member of the band Far Corporation. In 1985, they released their first studio album, Division One, which also included many contributions from former Toto bandmates David Paich and Steve Lukather.

He toured with a solo band from the late 1980s into the 1990s. This band consisted of longtime friend and saxophonist Jon Smith, guitarist and vocalist Dave Blasucci, guitarist Mark Manjardi, keyboardist Dave Porter, bassist Vince Bilbro, and drummer Jimmy Griego. They performed Toto songs as well as covers of songs by The Isley Brothers, Whitesnake, Donny Hathaway, George Michael, and Patti LaBelle.

Kimball also continued to work as a session artist, singing background vocals on songs by Quiet Riot, Al Jarreau, Richard Marx, and Trixter. Toto was planning Kimball's return in 1989 for the band's greatest hits album, Past to Present 1977–1990, and even recorded a song, "Goin' Home" (which was later released on Toto XX in 1998). Toto instead recruited singer Jean-Michel Byron (a decision said to have derived from Sony, the band's record company at the time). Byron was let go shortly thereafter, and guitarist-vocalist Steve Lukather took over Toto's primary lead vocal duties from 1991 to 1997. After leaving the band, Kimball released the live album Classic Toto Hits in late 1990, on which he performed various Toto songs from over the years. He recorded the album with the Frankfurt Rock Orchestra. In 1994, Kimball released his first solo album Rise Up, featuring the single "Woodstock".

=== Return to Toto ===
In 1998, Kimball rejoined Toto. They did a short tour in May and June 1998 to celebrate the band's 20th anniversary, also including former members Joseph Williams and Steve Porcaro . That summer, the band then returned to the studio with Kimball to record Mindfields. Toto toured in support of the album throughout 1999 and 2000. In late 1999, the band released the live album Livefields. In 1999, Kimball released his second solo album All I Ever Needed, with the single "Kristine". Recording for the album had begun in 1996. In 2002, Toto released an album of covers from artists that influenced them titled Through the Looking Glass. They also began their 25th Anniversary Tour, which lasted throughout 2004. In 2003, an album and DVD was released from that tour, 25th Anniversary: Live in Amsterdam.

Kimball, along with other Toto bandmates, was involved in the Pink Floyd tribute album, Pigs and Pyramids, An All Star Lineup Performing the Songs of Pink Floyd, released in 2002. His contribution "Have a Cigar" also appeared on another Pink Floyd tribute album that year, Pink Box: Songs of Pink Floyd.

In 2005, they went back into the studio to record their next album. In February 2006, Toto released Falling in Between, their first studio album of new material since 1999. They toured extensively throughout 2006 and 2007 in support of the album. They released a live album, Falling in Between Live recorded and released in 2007. In 2008, Toto toured Japan with Boz Scaggs. This tour also reached other Asian countries and Australia. In July 2008, guitarist Steve Lukather announced he was leaving the band, thus dissolving the rest of the group. When the group reformed in 2010, Kimball was not asked to return and was replaced by previous Toto vocalist Joseph Williams.

Kimball has hosted his own website where he offered vocal advice to aspiring singers.

=== Other activities ===
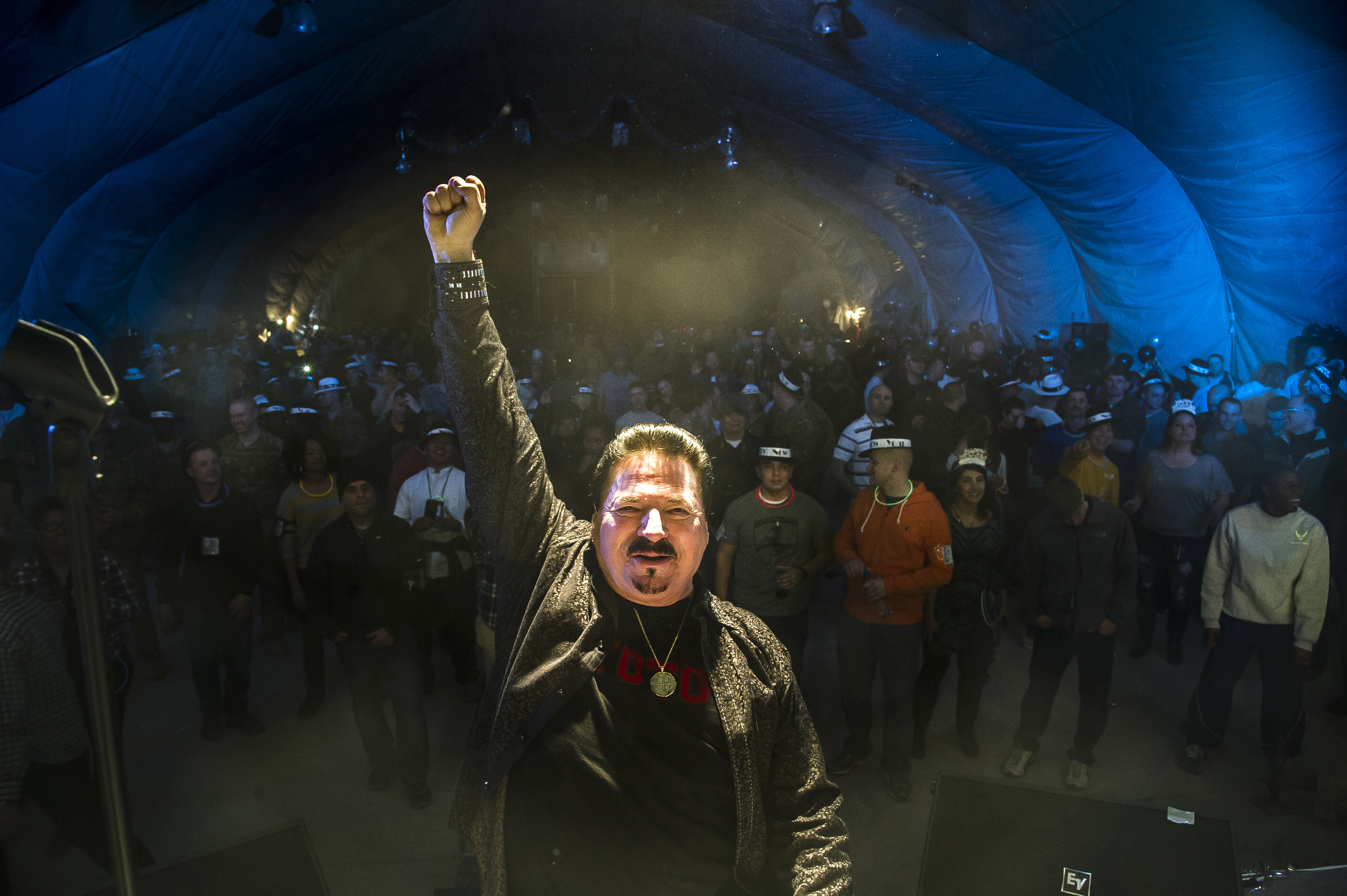
Bobby Kimball in December 2013

Kimball provided additional backing vocals on the song, "Caroline," on the 2006 Chicago album, XXX.

In January 2010, he did fourteen concerts in Germany on the "Rock Meets Classic" Tour with the Bohemian Symphony Orchestra Prague, featuring Philipp Maier as Conductor and Music Arranger. The singers with Kimball on this tour were Lou Gramm, the original lead vocalist of Foreigner, and Dan McCafferty, from the band Nazareth.

On May 16, 2010, at the LMHOF Louisiana Music Homecoming in Erwinville, Louisiana, Bobby Kimball was inducted into The Louisiana Music Hall of Fame.

Kimball recorded a progressive rock album in 2010 entitled Elements under the band name Yoso with former Yes members Tony Kaye and Billy Sherwood. Kimball recorded the 2011 album Kimball/Jamison with Jimi Jamison.

In July 2011, Kimball toured Ireland with an emerging Irish band, Shadowplay. The tour visited Dublin, Galway, Limerick and Sligo, concluding in a headline performance at The Buncrana Music Festival, Ireland's largest not-for-profit music event.

In November 2012 and March 2013, Kimball toured extensively in South America. The tour included Argentina, Uruguay, Chile and Peru and the backing band included musicians Tommy Denander and Gabe Treiyer. In March 2013, Kimball was a special guest vocalist with the Raiding the Rock Vault classic rock tribute show in Las Vegas, Nevada.

At Fiera Internazionale della Musica (FIM) in Genoa in May 2014, Kimball was awarded the Legend of Rock – Best Voice award. In February 2015, he represented the United States at the LVI International Song Festival in Viña del Mar, Chile, with the song "Living Your Life for Happiness".

In late 2016, he released a solo album, We're Not in Kansas Anymore, and the same year, music website No Echo featured Kimball on their "Best Male AOR Singers" list.

In November 2019, German media reported that Kimball has dementia. This was also confirmed by Steve Lukather in an interview with Eonmusic in 2021. In recent years, it has more specifically been identified as frontotemporal dementia.

A documentary about Kimball is planned to be released called, Kite on a String: The Bobby Kimball Story. It is being led by his longtime collaborator and producer John Zaika.

In 2022, Kimball contributed vocals on the Chicago song "Someone Needed Me the Most" from their twenty-sixth studio album Chicago XXXVIII: Born for This Moment.

=== Personal life ===
Kimball married Jasmin Kimball in 1996 and has a daughter named Allison Kimball from a previous relationship. He resides in Los Angeles, California and receives care from his wife and two caretakers.

== Discography ==
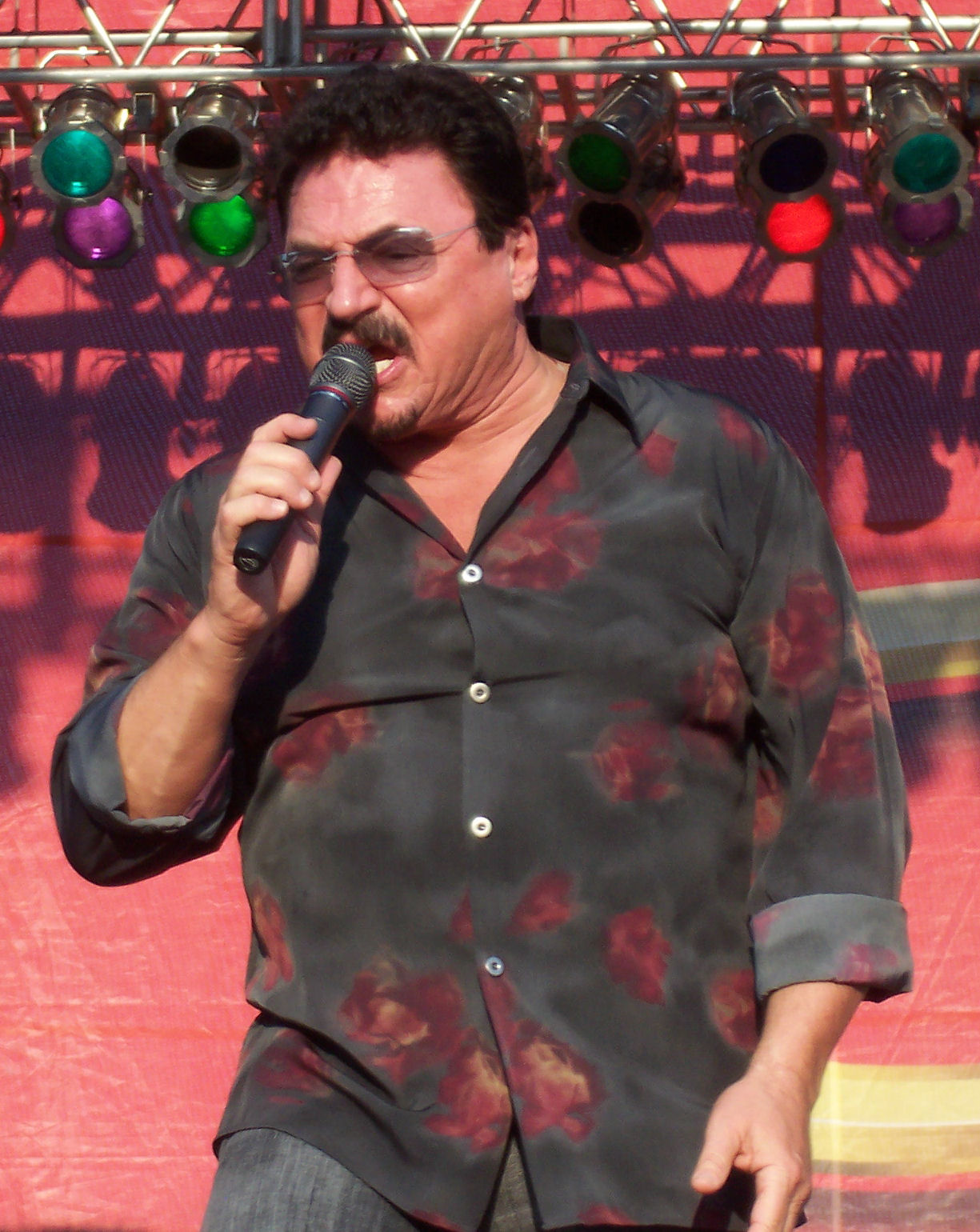
Kimball performing in 2007

=== Solo albums ===
- Rise Up (1994)
- All I Ever Needed (1999)
- We're Not in Kansas Anymore (2016)

=== Live albums ===
- Classic Toto Hits with The Frankfurt Rock Orchestra (1990)

=== Compilation albums ===
- Tribute to Ray Charles with The HR Bigband (1993)
- Mysterious Sessions (2017)

=== with S. S. Fools ===
- S. S. Fools (1976)

=== with Toto ===
- Toto (1978)
- Hydra (1979)
- Turn Back (1981)
- Toto IV (1982)
- Isolation (1984) (only on background vocals)
- Toto XX (1977–1997) (1998)
- Mindfields (1999)
- Through the Looking Glass (2002)
- Falling in Between (2006)

==== Live albums ====
- Livefields (1999)
- 25th Anniversary: Live in Amsterdam (2003)
- Falling in Between Live (2007)
- Live in Tokyo 1980 (2020)

=== with Far Corporation ===
- Division One (1985)
- Solitude (1994)

=== with West Coast All Stars ===
- California Dreamin' (1997)
- Naturally (1998)

=== with Yoso ===
- Elements (2010)

=== with Jimi Jamison ===
- Kimball Jamison (2011)

=== Guest appearances ===
- "Still of the Night" (with Quiet Riot on the album QR III) (1986)
- "What It Takes" (from the compilation album Tribute to Aerosmith: Let the Tribute Do the Talkin') (2001)
- "The Seventh Son" (with Chris Catena's Rock City Tribe on the album Truth in Unity) (2020)
- "Dust in the Wind" (with Robby Steinhardt on the album Not in Kansas Anymore (A Prog Opera)) (2021)
- "Someone Needed Me the Most" (with Chicago on the album Chicago XXXVIII: Born for This Moment) (2022)
