= Toto XX =

Toto XX: 1977–1997

Compilation album / studio album by Toto
- Released: May 25, 1998 (EU & JP); June 1, 1998 (UK); December 8, 1998 (US)
- Recorded: 1977–1998
- Venue: Montreux Jazz Festival (Montreux) Standard Bank Arena (Johannesburg)
- Studios: The Complex (Los Angeles); Sunset Sound Recorders (Hollywood); The Villa (Los Angeles); The Manor (Los Angeles); Schnee Studio (Los Angeles); Record One (Los Angeles); Abbey Road Studios (London); Studio 55 (Hollywood); Davlen Studios (North Hollywood)
- Genre: Rock
- Length: 69:15
- Label: Columbia
- Producer: Toto

Toto chronology
Tambu (1995)	Toto XX: 1977–1997 (1998)	Mindfields (1999)

Singles from Toto XX
- 1. "Goin' Home" Released: 1998

Toto XX: 1977–1997 is a compilation album by Toto to celebrate their 20th anniversary. The album features rare, previously unreleased recordings and live tracks from the band's 20-year career. These recordings include songs that were started throughout the band's career, but never completed. They are not the original recordings, as the band added guitar parts, vocals, etc. before releasing them on the album. Despite its being labeled as a compilation album, Steve Lukather in 2014 defined the album as the tenth studio album overall (see Toto XIV), as most of these recordings had never been released.

The first single released, "Goin' Home" was originally recorded during Bobby Kimball's brief first reunion with the band in 1989, prior to the record company's decision to replace him with new lead singer Jean-Michel Byron. The song had later been recorded by the band's then former singer Joseph Williams and released on his 1997 album 3. The song "In a Word" had only been released as the B-side of Fahrenheit's lead single, "I'll Be Over You" in 1986.

== Reception ==
Stephen Thomas Erlewine originally commented on AllMusic that "Essentially, this is a Toto reunion album, featuring nine new studio cuts and four live tracks" and said that the material was more similar to that on Tambu than the band's most recent studio album. Erlewine praised the performances but concluded the release to be "not particularly interesting to anyone except hardcore fans". A later AllMusic review was more positive, commenting on "soaring vocals" and "stunning instrumental", and acclaiming that the "powerful musical talent that makes up this group has always been in high gear".

== Track listing ==
No.	Title	Writer(s)	Lead vocals	Length
1.	"Goin' Home" (Recorded in 1989)	David Paich, Joseph Williams	Bobby Kimball	5:17
2.	"Tale of a Man" (Recorded in 1979)	Paich	Kimball	5:29
3.	"Last Night" (Recorded in 1987)	Paich, Williams	Williams	5:34
4.	"In a Word" (Recorded & released in 1986)	Steve Lukather, Steve Porcaro, Mike Porcaro, Jeff Porcaro	Williams	3:56
5.	"Modern Eyes" (Recorded in 1986)	Paich	Paich	4:24
6.	"Right Part of Me" (Recorded in 1984)	Paich, Kimball	Kimball	5:44
7.	"Mrs. Johnson" (Recorded in 1977)	Paich, Lukather	Kimball	3:48
8.	"Miss Sun" (Recorded in 1977)	Paich	Paich	5:04
9.	"Love is a Man's World" (Recorded in 1977)	Paich	Paich	6:16
10.	"On the Run" (Recorded at the Montreux Jazz Festival '91)	Paich, Lukather, Fee Waybill	Lukather	7:01
11.	"Dave's Gone Skiing (Instrumental)" (Recorded at the Standard Bank Arena, Johannesburg, South Africa in 1997)	M. Porcaro, Simon Phillips, Lukather		5:04
12.	"Baba Mnumzane" (Recorded at the Standard Bank Arena, Johannesburg, South Africa in 1997)	traditional; arr. L. Mkhize, M. Namba	Jenny Douglas-McRae, John James, & Family Factory	1:46
13.	"Africa" (Recorded at the Standard Bank Arena, Johannesburg, South Africa in 1997)	Paich, J. Porcaro	Paich	9:51

"On the Run" (Recorded at the Montreux Jazz Festival '91) and "Dave's Gone Skiing (Instrumental)" (Recorded at the Standard Bank Arena, Johannesburg, South Africa in 1997) were omitted from the All In 1978–2018 release of this album.

== Personnel ==
=== Toto ===
- Bobby Kimball – lead vocals (1, 2, 6, 7), backing vocals (9)
- Joseph Williams – lead vocals (3, 4), backing vocals (1)
- Steve Lukather – guitars (1–11, 13), lead vocals (10), backing vocals (1, 2, 5, 6)
- David Paich – keyboards (1, 3–5, 7, 8, 10, 11, 13), piano (2, 6, 9), Moog bass (8, 9), synthesizers (9), lead vocals (5, 8, 9, 13), backing vocals (1, 2, 5, 6, 10), string arrangements (6)
- Steve Porcaro – synthesizers (2, 4, 7), synthesizer programming (5, 9), sequencer (9)
- Mike Porcaro – bass (1, 3–6, 10, 11, 13)
- David Hungate – bass (2, 7), overdub bass fills (8)
- Jeff Porcaro – drums (1–4, 6–10), percussion (1, 3, 4, 9), Synclavier drums (5), timbales (5)
- Simon Phillips – drums (11, 13)

==== Additional musicians ====
- Jim Horn – saxophone (1, 3)
- Jerry Hey – trumpet (3), horn arrangements (3)
- Gary Grant – trumpet (3)
- Tom Scott – saxophone (3)
- Jimmy Pankow – trombone (3)
- David Sanborn – saxophone (5)
- James Newton Howard – string arrangements (6)
- Marty Paich – string arrangements (6), conductor (6)
- London Symphony Orchestra – strings (6)
- Lisa Dal Bello – co-lead vocals (8)
- Michael Boddicker – synthesizer programming (9)
- Chris Trujillo – percussion (10)
- Chris Thompson – backing vocals (3)
- Fred White – backing vocals (10)
- Jacci McGhee – backing vocals (10)
- Jenny Douglas-McRae – backing vocals (10, 13), vocals (12)
- John James – vocals (12), backing vocals (13)

==== Family Factory ====
- Margaret Motsage – vocals (12), percussion (12, 13), backing vocals (13)
- Gift Villakazi – vocals (12), percussion (12, 13), backing vocals (13)
- Victory Villakazi – vocals (12), percussion (12, 13), backing vocals (13)
- Nomhlahla Radebe – vocals (12), percussion (12, 13), backing vocals (13)
- Nokhanya Dlamini – vocals (12), percussion (12, 13), backing vocals (13)
- Sibongile Maktathe – vocals (12), percussion (12, 13), backing vocals (13)

=== Technical ===
- Executive producers – Steve Lukather and David Paich
- Engineered by Greg Ladanyi (1, 6), Shep Lonsdale (1, 4, 5), Tom Knox (2, 7–9), George Massenburg (3), Richard Mitchell (11–13)
- Mixed by Bobby Schaper (1), Elliot Scheiner (2, 3, 5–7, 11–13), Greg Ladanyi (4), Tom Knox (8, 9), Dirk Schubert (10)
- Drums engineer – Jack Joseph Puig (5)
- Strings engineer – John Kurlander (6)
- Recorded live by Dirk Schubert (10) and Bop Studios (11–13)
- Assistant engineers – David Segal, Kentse Mpahlwa, and Colin Finnie (11–13)

== Singles ==
- Goin' Home / Tale of a Man
