= Jenny Douglas-Foote =

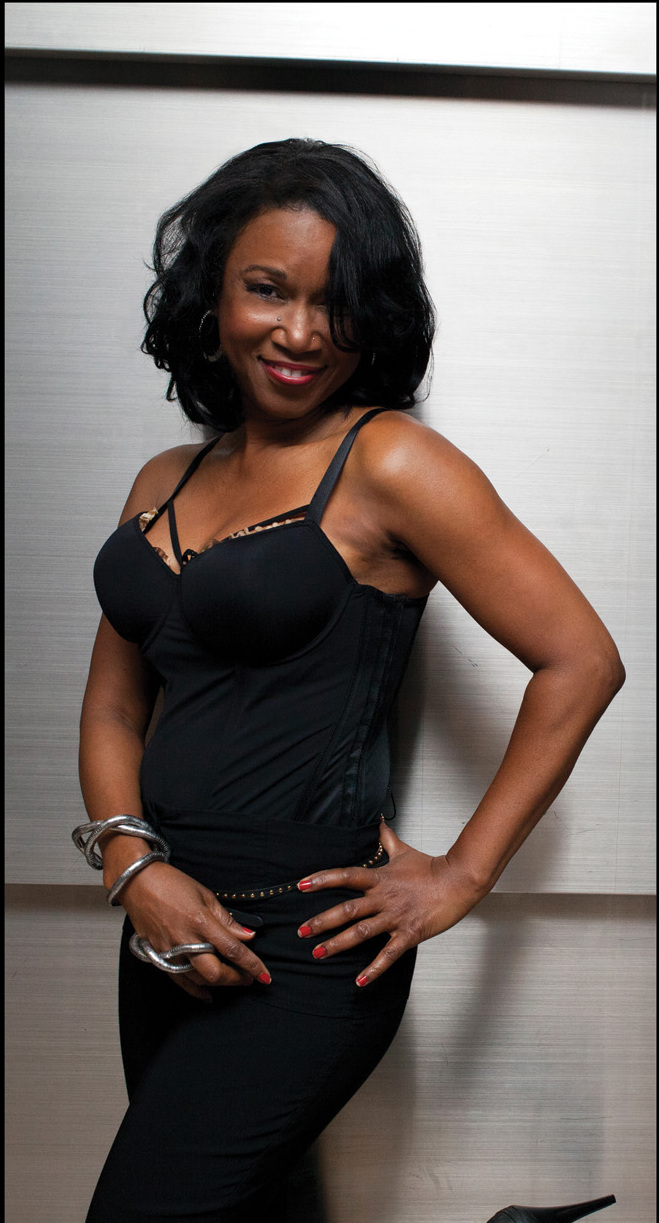
- Jenny Douglas-Foote in 2012.

Background information
- Also known as: Jenny Douglas, Jenny Douglas-McRae
- Born: Jennifer Dawn Douglas; March 3, 1957 (age 69)
- Origin: Chicago, Illinois, U.S.
- Genres: Rock
- Instrument: vocals
- Spouses: Warren McRae (divorced); Gary Foote (m. 2010)

Jennifer Dawn Douglas-Foote (née Douglas; formerly Douglas-McRae; born March 3, 1957) is an American singer and actress. She is best known for touring with the rock band Toto from 1990 to 1997 and again during the 2010s. In addition, she has performed with numerous artists, including Pink, Rob Thomas, Cher, Janet Jackson, Mick Jagger, Lenny Kravitz, Moby, Donny Osmond, John Mellencamp, Joe Cocker, Enrique Iglesias, Patti LaBelle, Nona Hendryx, Patti Austin, Glenn Lewis, Joey McIntyre, Elton John, Tina Turner, Madonna, and Snoop Dogg.
