= John Jessel =

American audio engineer and keyboard technician

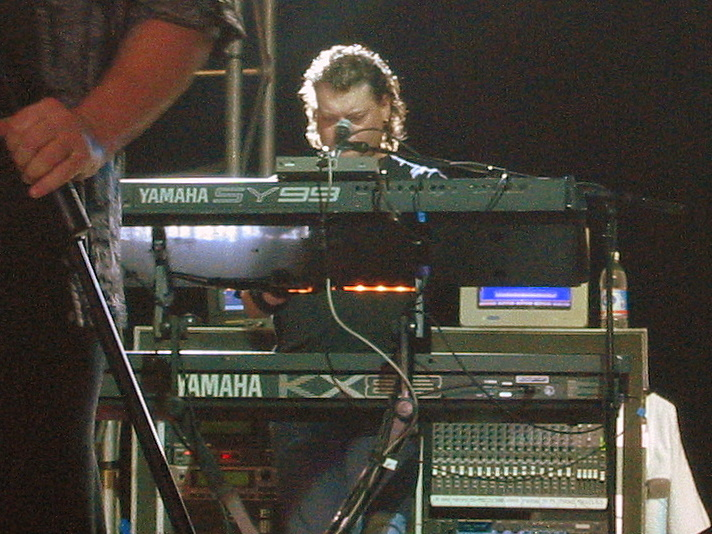
- Jessel in Padova, Italy on December 7, 2003.

Background information
- Also known as: JJ
- Born: John William Jessel; August 10, 1959 (age 67)
- Origin: Los Angeles, California, U.S.
- Genre: Rock
- Occupations: Audio engineer; keyboard technician
- Instruments: Keyboards; vocals

John William Jessel (born August 10, 1959) is an American audio engineer, keyboard technician, and keyboardist. He is known for his work with the rock band Toto, where he served as David Paich's personal engineer and studio manager, as well as a keyboard technician and offstage keyboardist. Jessel began working with the band in 1986 after a referral from Steve Lukather. From 1990 to 2003, he performed Steve Porcaro's keyboard parts after Porcaro stepped away from touring to focus on composing. He additionally triggered samples and loops to add to the sound design of each gig. Jessel also contributed engineering, keyboard programming, and other production work to several of the band's recordings.

== Discography ==
Adapted from John Jessel's discography list on AllMusic.

- Fahrenheit (1986) by Toto – Engineer, Technician
- Start Over (1987) by Cheryl Lynn – Engineer
- The Seventh One (1988) by Toto – Engineer, Technician
- Straight Talk [Music from the Original Motion Picture Soundtrack] (1992) by Dolly Parton – Engineer
- Tambu (1995) by Toto – Engineer, Programming, Keyboard Programming, Setup
- Louder Than Words (1996) by Lionel Richie – Engineer
- Fade Into Light (1999) by Boz Scaggs – Engineer
- Livefields (1999) by Toto – Vocals (Background), Keyboard Technician
- Dig (2001) by Boz Scaggs – Keyboard Programming
- Through the Looking Glass (2002) by Toto – Engineer
- 25th Anniversary: Live in Amsterdam (2003) by Toto – Vocals, Keyboards
- 25th Anniversary: Live in Amsterdam [DVD] (2003) by Toto – Vocals, Keyboards
- Retro-Spec(t) (2004) by Larry Klimas – Engineer
- Falling In Between (2006) by Toto – Engineer
- Toto IV/The Seventh One (2007) by Toto – Engineer, Technician
- A Very Special Christmas Playlist Plus (2008) – Engineer
- A Very Special Christmas, Vols. 1-2 (2011) – Engineer
- 40 Trips Around the Sun (2018) by Toto – Engineer, Technician
- All In (2018) by Toto – Engineer, Synthesizer Programming, Technician

Undated

- Éxitos De Siempre En Concierto by Various Artists – Engineer
- Top Músicas de Amor by Various Artists – Engineer
- Summertime Groove by Various Artists – Engineer
- Romanticas Internacionais [Sony Music] by Various Artists – Engineer
- Músicas dos Anos 80 [Internacionais] by Various Artists – Engineer
- Lugna Favoriter by Various Artists – Engineer
- Love Songs by Various Artists – Engineer
- KuschelRock 37 by Various Artists – Engineer
- Hits Van De Jaren 90 by Various Artists – Engineer
- Flashback Anos 90 [Internacionais] by Various Artists – Engineer
- Best Live Performances: 2000–2020 by Various Artists – Engineer
- Back to the US of A by Various Artists – Engineer
- BBQ Classics by Various Artists – Engineer
- Anos 80: Nostalgia Internacionais by Various Artists – Engineer
- AOR CITY Loves Winter by Various Artists – Engineer
- 80's Clássicos Internacionais by Various Artists – Engineer
- 100 R&B Platinum Superstar Hits by Various Artists – Engineer
