= Mike Porcaro =

American bassist (1955–2015)

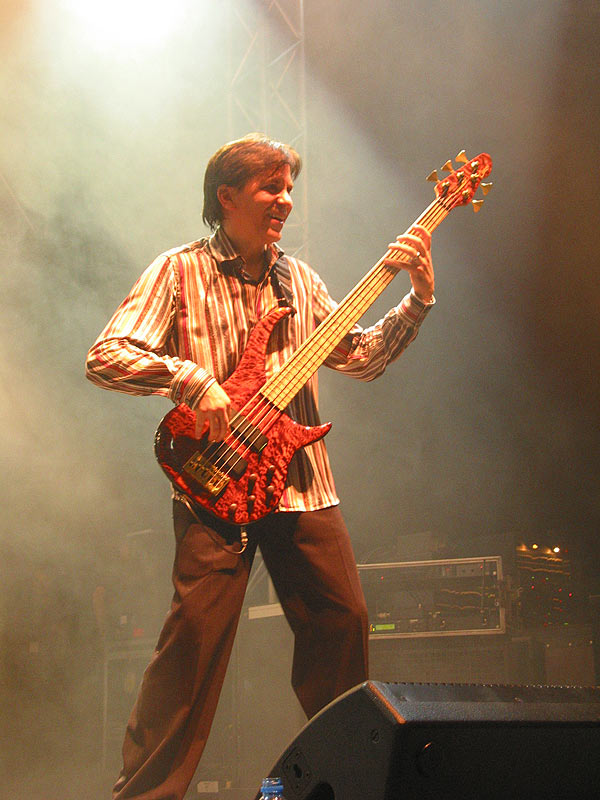
- Porcaro in 2005

Background information
- Born: Michael Joseph Porcaro; May 29, 1955; South Windsor, Connecticut, U.S.
- Died: March 15, 2015 (aged 59) Los Angeles, California, U.S.
- Genres: Hard rock; pop rock; progressive rock
- Occupation: Bassist
- Instrument: Bass guitar
- Years active: 1971–2007
- Formerly of: Toto; Bee Gees
- Spouse: Cheryl Porcaro (m. 1987)

Michael Joseph Porcaro (May 29, 1955 – March 15, 2015) was an American bassist known for his work with the rock band Toto. He retired from touring in 2007 as a result of being diagnosed with amyotrophic lateral sclerosis (ALS).

He was the middle brother of Toto members Jeff Porcaro and Steve Porcaro. Their father was jazz drummer-percussionist Joe Porcaro.

== Early life ==
Mike Porcaro is the second of the three Porcaro brothers. The three brothers were taught drums by their father at his drum shop every weekend. Jeff said that he himself wasn't the best drummer, adding that Mike was a better player than him before he switched to bass, while Steve later took up piano before they moved to California. Jeff explained that when the brothers took guitar lessons, Mike took off at the instrument while Jeff gave up after three lessons, and since the family had only one drum kit and one bass, Mike was assigned the bass. Mike Porcaro was also a member of the Baháʼí Faith. He was of Italian descent.

== Career ==
Porcaro first began his career in bands he was a member of while in high school, one of them was alongside his brother Jeff Porcaro and other future members of Toto. Porcaro worked as a session bass player throughout the mid and late 1970s for numerous musicians and bands before replacing Toto original bass player David Hungate in 1982 shortly after the band completed recording the Toto IV album. Porcaro played cello on a track for the album and subsequently appeared in the band's videos and performed as a full band member on the world tour in support of the album. He remained with the band until 2007.

Along with Toto, Porcaro played numerous sessions in Los Angeles, and toured with Michael Franks on his first tour. He then toured with Seals and Crofts, Larry Carlton, and Boz Scaggs. He appears in the video for the song "JoJo" by Scaggs. In Flames bass player Peter Iwers said that his bass playing style was influenced by Porcaro.

== Amyotrophic lateral sclerosis and death ==
Porcaro stopped performing with Toto in 2007 after experiencing a growing weakness in his fingers that was making it increasingly difficult for him to play. He was replaced by Leland Sklar for the remainder of the tour and Toto disbanded in 2008. In February 2010, it was announced that Porcaro was diagnosed with amyotrophic lateral sclerosis (ALS) and that former band members of Toto, including Steve Porcaro, would reform and do a short tour through Europe in support of him in the summer of 2010. The regrouped Toto continued to tour and perform for Mike's benefit during 2011.

In 2011, Porcaro released his debut album, "Brotherly Love," which would contain tracks from the band Toto, like "Rosanna," "Africa," "Georgy Porgy" and English Eyes, and also Michael Jackson's "Human Nature."

In September 2012, it was reported in Classic Rock magazine that he was doing as well as could be expected with his disease but was using a wheelchair as the disease was progressing.

Porcaro died at his Los Angeles home on March 15, 2015, at the age of 59 with his family at his side from complications of ALS. He was buried at Forest Lawn Memorial Park in the Hollywood Hills of Los Angeles. He left behind his wife Cheryl, whom he married in 1987, and their three children.

Three years after his death, in 2018, Porcaro and his brother Jeff (who died in 1992) appeared on two Toto albums, where the band used archived recordings of both musicians from the mid-1980s.

== Personal life ==
In 1987, Porcaro married Cheryl Porcaro. The couple had three children, Brianne, Sam, and Jeffrey. After his death, Cheryl married Andrew Leeds on August 25, 2019.

== Discography ==
=== With Toto ===
- Toto IV (1982)
- Isolation (1984)
- Dune (1984)
- Fahrenheit (1986)
- The Seventh One (1988)
- Past to Present 1977–1990 (1990)
- Kingdom of Desire (1992)
- Tambu (1995)
- Toto XX (1998)
- Mindfields (1999)
- Through the Looking Glass (2002)
- Falling in Between (2006)
- Old Is New (2018)

=== Solo ===
- Brotherly Love (2011)

=== Other ===
- Dane Donohue / Dane Donohue (Columbia 1978)
- Grease / soundtrack(1978)
- Everyman A King / Avalon (1982)
- For the Love of Strange Medicine / Steve Perry (1994)
