= Steve Lukather discography =

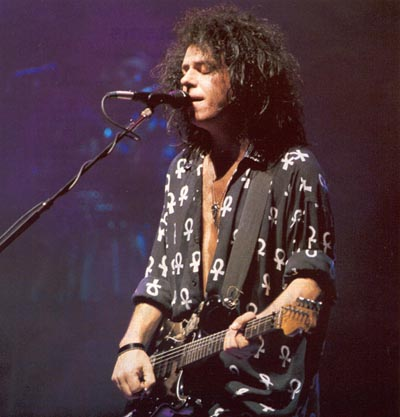
- Steve Lukather performing live in 1990.
- Studio albums: 9
- Live albums: 4
- Singles: 6
- Video albums: 1

This article lists the complete discography of Steve Lukather.

== Albums ==
=== Studio albums ===
Year	Title
1989	Lukather
1989	Los Lobotomys
1994	Candyman (Note: Released under the Los Lobotomys name on the Japanese and US releases)
1997	Luke
2003	Santamental
2008	Ever Changing Times
2010	All's Well That Ends Well
2013	Transition
2021	I Found the Sun Again
2023	Bridges

=== Live albums ===
Year	Title	US Jazz
1986	Lotus Gem feat. Carlos Santana & Jeff Beck	—
2001	No Substitutions feat. Larry Carlton	29
2005	El Grupo Live feat. El Grupo	—
2010	An Odd Couple Live feat. Edgar Winter	—

=== Soundtracks ===
Year	Title
2005	Dragon Ball Z & Z 2 Original Soundtrack
2005	Dragon Ball Z 3 Original Soundtrack

== Singles ==
Year	Title	Album
1989	"Swear Your Love"	Lukather
1994	"Borrowed Time"	Candyman
1997	"Hate Everything About You"	Luke
2008	"Ever Changing Times"	Ever Changing Times
2010	"Can't Look Back"	All's Well That Ends Well
2020	"Run to Me"	I Found the Sun Again

== Videos ==
Year	Title
2002	In Concert (Steve Lukather & Los Lobotomys)
2005	The Paris Concert (Larry Carlton Steve Lukather Band)

== As sideman or guest ==
With Herb Alpert

- Magic Man (A&M, 1981)
- Blow Your Own Horn (A&M, 1983)

With America

- Alibi (Capitol, 1980)
- View from the Ground (Capitol, 1982)

With Carole Bayer Sager

- ...Too (Elektra, 1978)
- Sometimes Late at Night (Boardwalk, 1981)

With George Benson

- Songs and Stories (Concord Records, 2009)

With Michael Bolton

- Soul Provider (Columbia, 1989)
- Timeless: The Classics Vol. 2 (Columbia Records, 1999)

With Terence Boylan

- Terence Boylan (Asylum, 1977)

With Larry Carlton

- No Substitutions: Live in Osaka (Favored Nations, 2001)
- The Paris Concert (335, 2009)
- At Blue Note Tokyo (335, 2016)

With Bill Champlin

- Single (Full Moon, 1978)
- Runaway (Elektra, 1981)
- Burn Down the Night (Emotion, 1992)
- Through It All (Turnip The Music Group, 1994)
- No Place Left To Fall (DreamMakers Music, 2008)

With Cher

- Take Me Home (Casablanca, 1979)
- Prisoner (Casablanca, 1979)
- I Paralyze (Columbia, 1982)
- Cher (Geffen, 1987)
- Heart of Stone (Geffen, 1989)
- Love Hurts (Geffen, 1991)

With Chicago

- Chicago 16 (Warner Bros., 1982)
- Chicago 18 (Warner Bros., 1986)

With Joe Cocker

- Civilized Man (Capitol, 1984)
- Heart & Soul (EMI, 2004)

With Alice Cooper

- From the Inside (Warner Bros., 1978)
- Trash (Epic, 1989)

With Randy Crawford

- Secret Combination (Warner Bros., 1981)
- Windsong (Warner Bros., 1982)
- Nightline (Warner Bros., 1983)

With Peter Criss

- Peter Criss (Casablanca, 1978)
- Out of Control (Casablanca, 1980)
- Let Me Rock You (Casablanca, 1982)

With Dalbello

- Lisa Dal Bello (MCA, 1977)
- Pretty Girls (Talisman, 1979)

With Neil Diamond

- Headed for the Future (Columbia, 1986)
- The Best Years of Our Lives (CBS, 1988)

With Charlie Dore

- Listen! (Chrysalis Records, 1981)

With Earth, Wind & Fire

- I Am (Columbia, 1979)
- Faces (Columbia, 1980)

With Aretha Franklin

- Aretha (Arista, 1980)
- Love All the Hurt Away (Arista, 1981)

With Ted Gärdestad

- Blue Virgin Isles (Polar, 1978)

With Randy Goodrum

- Caretaker of Dreams (Polydor, 1991)
- Words and Music (Polydor, 1994)
- Songbook (Beverly, 1995)

With Michael Jackson

- Thriller (Epic, 1982)

With Elton John

- Victim of Love (MCA, 1979)
- 21 at 33 (Rocket, 1980)
- The Fox (Rocket, 1981)

With Quincy Jones

- The Dude (A&M, 1981)
- Back on the Block (Qwest, 1989)

With Rickie Lee Jones

- Pirates (Warner Bros., 1981)
- The Magazine (Warner Bros., 1984)

With Marc Jordan

- Mannequin (Warner Bros., 1978)
- Blue Desert (Warner Bros., 1979)
- A Hole in the Wall (Sound Design, 1993)

With Leah Kunkel

- Leah Kunkel (Columbia, 1979)
- I Run With Trouble (Columbia, 1980)

With Kenny Loggins

- High Adventure (Columbia, 1982)
- Vox Humana (Columbia, 1985)

With Cheryl Lynn

- Cheryl Lynn (Columbia, 1978)
- Start Over (Manhattan Records, 1987)

With Melissa Manchester

- Hey Ricky (Arista, 1982)
- Mathematics (MCA Records, 1985)

With Richard Marx

- Repeat Offender (EMI, 1989)
- Rush Street (Capitol, 1991)
- Flesh and Bone (Capitol, 1997)

With Johnny Mathis and Deniece Williams

- That's What Friends Are For (Columbia, 1979)

With Michael McDonald

- If That's What It Takes (Warner Bros., 1982)
- No Lookin' Back (Warner Bros., 1986)

With Mary MacGregor

- Mary MacGregor (RSO Records, 1980)

With Adam Mitchell

- Redhead in Trouble (Asylum, 1979)

With Joni Mitchell

- Wild Things Run Fast (Geffen, 1982)
- Dog Eat Dog (Geffen, 1985)

With Olivia Newton-John

- Totally Hot (MCA, 1978)
- Physical (EMI, 1981)
- Soul Kiss (Mercury, 1985)

With Randy Newman

- Trouble in Paradise (Warner Bros., 1983)
- Land of Dreams (Reprise, 1988)

With Kenny Nolan

- A Song Between Us (Polydor, 1978)

With Lionel Richie

- Can't Slow Down (Motown, 1983)
- Dancing on the Ceiling (Sonolux, 1985)
- Louder Than Words (Mercury, 1996)

With Lee Ritenour

- Feel the Night (Elektra, 1979)
- 6 String Theory (Concord, 2010)

With Kenny Rogers

- We've Got Tonight (Liberty, 1983)
- The Heart of the Matter (RCA, 1985)
- They Don't Make Them Like They Used To (RCA, 1986)

With Diana Ross

- Baby It's Me (Motown, 1977)
- Ross (RCA, 1983)

With Leo Sayer

- Leo Sayer (Chrysalis, 1978)
- Here (Warner Bros., 1979)
- World Radio (Warner Bros., 1982)
- Have You Ever Been in Love (Chrysalis, 1983)

With Boz Scaggs

- Down Two Then Left (Columbia, 1977)
- Middle Man (CBS, 1980)
- Other Roads (Columbia, 1988)
- Dig (Virgin, 2001)

With Derek Sherinian

- Inertia (Inside Out, 2001)
- Black Utopia (Inside Out, 2003)
- Mythology (Inside Out, 2004)
- Oceana (Music Theories, 2011)
- Vortex (Inside Out, 2022)

With Ringo Starr

- Postcards from Paradise (Universal Music Enterprises, 2015)
- Give More Love (Universal Music Enterprises, 2017)
- What's My Name (Universal Music Enterprises, 2019)
- Zoom In (UMe, 2021)
- Change the World (UMe, 2021)
- EP3 (UMe, 2022)
- Rewind Forward (UMe, 2023)

With Barbra Streisand

- Songbird (Columbia, 1978)
- Wet (Columbia, 1979)

With Donna Summer

- The Wanderer (Geffen, 1980)
- Donna Summer (Geffen, 1982)

With Marc Tanner Band

- No Escape (Elektra Records, 1979)

With Tavares

- Supercharged (Capitol, 1980)

With The Manhattan Transfer

- Extensions (Atlantic, 1979)
- Mecca for Moderns (Atlantic, 1981)

With Fee Waybill and The Tubes

- The Completion Backward Principle (Capitol, 1981)
- Outside Inside (Capitol, 1983)
- Read My Lips (Capitol, 1984)
- Don't Be Scared by These Hands (Westcoast, 1996)

With Jimmy Webb

- Angel Heart (Sony, 1982)
- Suspending Disbelief (Elektra Records, 1993)

With Deniece Williams

- When Love Comes Calling (Columbia Records, 1978)

With Joseph Williams

- Joseph Williams (MCA, 1982)
- 3 (Kitty Records, 1997)
- This Fall (WHD Entertainment, Inc., 2008)
- Denizen Tenant (The Players Club, 2021)

With Wilson Phillips

- Wilson Phillips (SBK, 1990)
- Shadows and Light (SBK, 1992)

With Jesse Colin Young

- The Perfect Stranger (Elektra, 1982)

With others

- Peter Allen, Bi-Coastal (A&M, 1980)
- Jon Anderson, In the City of Angels (CBS, 1988)
- Paul Anka, Walk a Fine Line (Columbia, 1983)
- Chet Atkins, Stay Tuned (Columbia, 1985)
- Patti Austin, Every Home Should Have One (Qwest, 1981)
- Stephen Bishop, Bowling in Paris (Atlantic, 1989)
- Gregg Bissonette, Siblings (Dogs in Space, 1992)
- Laura Branigan, Branigan (Atlantic, 1982)
- The Brothers Johnson, Winners (A&M, 1981)
- Jackson Browne, Lives in the Balance (Asylum, 1986)
- Belinda Carlisle, Runaway Horses (Virgin, 1989)
- Eric Carmen, Tonight You're Mine (Arista Records, 1980)
- Kim Carnes, Café Racers (EMI, 1983)
- Lenny Castro, Hands of Silk and Stone (2018)
- Peter Cetera, Peter Cetera (Warner Bros. Records, 1981)
- Char, U.S.J (Pony Canyon, 1981)
- Desmond Child, Discipline (Elektra Records, 1991)
- Eric Clapton, Behind the Sun (Warner Bros., 1985)
- Clarence Clemons, A Night with Mr. C (Legacy, 2016)
- Jimmy Cliff, Give Thankx (Warner Bros., 1978)
- Rosemary Clooney, Still on the Road (Concord Jazz, 1994)
- David Crosby, Oh Yes I Can (A&M, 1989)
- Christopher Cross, Another Page (Warner Bros., 1983)
- The Crusaders, Healing the Wounds (GRP, 1991)
- England Dan & John Ford Coley, Dr. Heckle and Mr. Jive (Big Tree, 1979)
- Sheena Easton, A Private Heaven (EMI, 1984)
- David Essex, Be-Bop the Future (Mercury, 1981)
- Eye to Eye, Shakespeare Stole My Baby (Warner Bros., 1983)
- Lara Fabian, Lara Fabian (Epic Records, 2000)
- Don Felder, Road to Forever (Top Ten, 2012)
- David Foster, River of Love (Atlantic, 1990)
- Peter Frampton, Breaking All the Rules (A&M, 1981)
- Craig Fuller, Eric Kaz, Craig Fuller and Eric Kaz (Columbia Records, 1978)
- Art Garfunkel, Lefty (CBS, 1988)
- Gilberto Gil, Realce (Elektra, 1979)
- Louise Goffin, Kid Blue (Asylum, 1979)
- Tony Hadley, The State of Play (EMI, 1992)
- Hall & Oates, Along the Red Ledge (RCA, 1978)
- Herbie Hancock, Lite Me Up (CBS, 1982)
- Don Henley, I Can't Stand Still (Asylum, 1982)
- David Hungate, Souvenir (Clubhouse, 1994)
- Paul Jabara, Keeping Time (Casablanca, 1978)
- The Jacksons, Victory (Epic, 1984)
- Al Jarreau, Breakin' Away (Warner Bros., 1981)
- Jermaine Jackson, Precious Moments (Arista, 1986)
- Booker T. Jones, The Runaway (MCA, 1989)
- Naoko Kawai, 9 ½ NINE HALF (Nippon Columbia, 1985)
- Chaka Khan, I Feel for You (Warner Bros., 1984)
- Bill LaBounty, Bill LaBounty (Warner Bros., 1982)
- Greg Lake, Greg Lake (Chrysalis, 1981)
- Rita Lee, Bombom (Som Livre, 1983)
- Tony Levin, Resonator (Narada, 2006)
- Harvey Mason, Groovin' You (Arista, 1979)
- John Mayall, Bottom Line (DJM, 1979)
- Meat Loaf, Live Around the World (Tommy Boy, 1996)
- Ronnie Milsap, Heart & Soul (RCA, 1987)
- Graham Nash, Earth & Sky (Capitol, 1980)
- Stevie Nicks, The Wild Heart (Modern, 1983)
- Nielsen/Pearson, Nielsen/Pearson (Capitol, 1983)
- Ozzy Osbourne, Prince of Darkness (Epic, 2005)
- David Paich, Forgotten Toys (The Players Club, 2022)
- Steve Porcaro, Someday/Somehow (Porcara, 2016)
- Billy Preston, The Way I Am (Motown, 1981)
- Helen Reddy, We'll Sing in the Sunshine (Capitol, 1978)
- Brenda Russell, Love Life (A&M Records, 1981)
- Timothy B. Schmit, Playin' It Cool (Asylum, 1984)
- Dan Seals, Stones (Atlantic, 1980)
- Bob Seger, The Fire Inside (Capitol, 1991)
- Spinal Tap, Break Like the Wind (MCA, 1992)
- Rod Stewart, Vagabond Heart (Warner Bros., 1991)
- Bernie Taupin, He Who Rides the Tiger (Elektra Records, 1980)
- The Valentine Brothers, Have a Good Time (A&M Records, 1984)
- Leon Ware, Leon Ware (Atlantic Records, 1982)
- Dionne Warwick, Friends in Love (Arista Records, 1982)
- Roger Waters, Amused to Death (Columbia, 1992)
- Ernie Watts, Chariots of Fire (Wounded Bird, 2005)
- Tim Weisberg, Outrageous Temptations (Cypress, 1989)
- Leslie West, Unusual Suspects (Provogue, 2011)
- John Wetton, Voice Mail/Battle Lines (Eclipse, 1994)
- Stevie Woods, Take Me to Your Heaven (Cotillion, 1981)
- Stevie Woods, The Woman in My Life (Cotillion, 1982)
- Gary Wright, Headin' Home (Warner Bros., 1979)
- Syreeta Wright, Syreeta (Motown, 1980)
- Warren Zevon, The Envoy (Asylum, 1982)
