= Joseph Williams (album) =

Studio album by Joseph Williams
- Released: June 1982
- Recorded: 1980–1982
- Studio: Jennifudy Recording Studios (North Hollywood)
- Genre: AOR
- Length: 31:05
- Label: MCA
- Producer: Jay Gruska

Joseph Williams chronology
Joseph Williams (1982)	I Am Alive (1996)

Singles from Joseph Williams
- 1. "That First Night" Released: 1982; 2. "(Momma) I Didn't Do It" Released: 1982

Joseph Williams is the debut studio album by American singer-songwriter Joseph Williams, released in June 1982 on MCA Records. The album features many musicians from the bands Maxus and Toto, the latter of which Williams would join in 1986. The album also features musicians from Williams' former band Joair, which included David Garfield, Michael Landau, Dean Cortez, and Mark T. Williams, Joseph's older brother. They performed at local Los Angeles clubs in the early 1980s.

== Background ==
Producer Jay Gruska's band Maxus was recording their 1981 debut album across the hall when they heard Williams recording his demo tapes, and they soon developed a friendship. Other Maxus members on Williams’ album are Robbie Buchanan and Michael Landau, as well as their producer, Michael Omartian.

== Track listing ==
All tracks are written by Joseph Williams, with additional writers noted.

Side one
No.	Title	Writer(s)	Length
1.	"What Is She Hiding"	Jay Gruska; Bruce Gowdy	3:31
2.	"That First Night"	Barry Fasman	3:14
3.	"Takin' It"	Gruska	3:30
4.	"One More Chance"	John Lang	3:53
5.	"I Didn't Do It"	Gruska; Michael Landau	3:53

Side two
No.	Title	Writer(s)	Length
6.	"This Girl"	Fasman	3:31
7.	"Something Special"	David Garfield	3:30
8.	"Nothing's Lost"	Gruska; Garfield; Jennifer Williams	3:44
9.	"Make Some Time"	Landau	3:19
Total length:			31:05

== Personnel ==
Adapted from the album's liner notes.

=== Musicians ===
- Joseph Williams – lead vocals, backing vocals (2–4, 6, 9), piano (1, 7), Fender Rhodes (4), Hammond B-3 (7, 9), arrangements
- David Garfield – piano (1, 2, 7), synthesizers (3, 7), Yamaha GS-1 (3, 9), Fender Rhodes (6)
- Robbie Buchanan – synthesizers (1, 2, 4–6), Fender Rhodes (5), string arrangements (2), synthesizer arrangements
- Jay Gruska – Hammond B-3 (3), Moog bass (7), backing vocals (3, 4), synthesizer arrangements, arrangements
- Michael Omartian – piano (8), string arrangements (8)
- Michael Landau – guitar (1–5, 7, 9), acoustic guitar (2, 4)
- Steve Lukather – guitar solo (1), guitar (6), 12-string acoustic guitar (6)
- Dean Cortez – bass (1–7, 9)
- Mark T. Williams – drums (1–7, 9)
- Lenny Castro – percussion (3–7, 9)
- Steve Tavaglione – saxophone (3)
- Jim Horn – saxophone (5)
- Larry Williams – saxophone (5)
- Jerry Hey – trumpet (5), horn arrangements (5)
- Chuck Findley – trumpet (5)
- Larry Hall – trumpet (5)
- Richard Page – backing vocals (1, 4, 5, 7)
- Steve George – backing vocals (1, 5, 7)
- Tommy Funderburk – backing vocals (1, 5, 7)
- Assa Drori – concertmaster (2, 8)

=== Technical ===
- Produced by Jay Gruska
- Executive producer – Barry Bregman
- Recorded and mixed by Frank Wolf
- Mastered by Ken Perry at Capitol Records (Hollywood, CA)
- Art direction and design – Arnie Roberts
- Photography – Jeff Dunas
