= Bottom of Your Soul =

2006 single by Toto

Single by Toto

from the album Falling in Between
- Released: February 3, 2006
- Recorded: 2005
- Studio: Phantom Recordings, Sherman Oaks, CA
- Genre: Progressive rock, soft rock, world music
- Length: 6:59 (album version)
- Label: Frontiers
- Songwriters: David Paich, Steve Lukather, Simon Phillips, Bobby Kimball, Mike Porcaro
- Producer: Toto

Toto singles chronology
"While My Guitar Gently Weeps" (2002)	"Bottom of Your Soul" (2006)	"Orphan" (2015)

Alternative cover
- summer edition

"Bottom of Your Soul" is a song by the American pop/rock band Toto. It was released as the only single from their album Falling in Between. There were two pressings of the single: one with two renditions of the title track while the other was a 4-track summer 2006 edition. It failed to make the charts in either the USA or UK, but it was a top 40 hit in The Netherlands. The chorus of the song features Joseph Williams, who was then in the middle of his long hiatus from the group, and is the first and only single from the band to feature Greg Phillinganes.

The music to the song was written collaboratively by nearly all the members of Toto, while the lyrics were written solely by David Paich.

== Track listings ==
1. "Bottom Of Your Soul" (radio edit) – (4:00)
2. "Bottom Of Your Soul" (album version) – (6:59)

=== Summer edition ===
1. "Bottom Of Your Soul" (radio edit) – (3:59)
2. "Gypsy Train" (live) – (7:12)
3. "Africa / Rosanna / Bottom Of Your Soul" (TV mix medley - live) – (4:50)
4. "Bottom Of Your Soul" (album version) – (6:59)

== Personnel ==
Adapted from Falling in Between album liner notes.

=== Toto ===
- Steve Lukather – lead vocals (verses), guitars
- Bobby Kimball – backing vocals
- David Paich – synthesizers, backing vocals
- Greg Phillinganes – digital piano, synthesizers, backing vocals
- Mike Porcaro – bass
- Simon Phillips – drums

=== Additional musicians ===
- Joseph Williams – lead vocals (choruses)
- Jason Scheff – backing vocals
- L. Shankar – backing vocals
- Lenny Castro – percussion

=== Production ===
- Toto – producer
- Simon Phillips – head audio engineer
- Stefan Nordin – assistant audio engineer
- Niko Bolas – engineer
- Steve Barri Cohen – engineer
- Mike Ging – engineer
- John Jessel – engineer
- Phil Soussan – engineer
- Steve MacMillan – mixing engineer
- Stephen Marcussen – mastering engineer

== Chart performance ==
Chart (2006)	Peak position
Netherlands (Single Top 100)	32
