= Falling in Between =

Studio album by Toto
- Released: (Japan) January 25, 2006 (Europe) February 10, 2006 (United States) April 18, 2006
- Recorded: February–October 2005
- Studios: Phantom Recordings (Sherman Oaks); ATS Studios (Calabasas); Steve Cohen's studio (Studio City)
- Genres: Progressive rock; progressive metal; hard rock; pop rock
- Length: 50:36
- Label: Frontiers
- Producer: Toto

Toto chronology
The Essential Toto (2003)	Falling in Between (2006)	Falling in Between Live (2007)

Singles from Falling in Between
- 1. "Bottom of Your Soul" Released: February 3, 2006

Falling in Between is the twelfth studio album (though counted as the 13th album overall — see Toto XX) by American rock band Toto. The album was released on the Italian label Frontiers Records in Japan on January 25, 2006, in Europe, Australia, and Asia on February 10, 2006, and in the United States on April 18, 2006. The album's only single, Bottom of Your Soul, also received a summer edition pressing with three other tracks. The band supported the album with a world tour.

It was the band's first release of new material since Mindfields in 1999, and their first studio release since Through the Looking Glass in 2002. It was their only album with keyboardist/vocalist Greg Phillinganes, who originally began playing with the band in 2003 as a touring replacement for David Paich, who had to take time off to care for his sister. It was also their last album with vocalist Bobby Kimball, bassist Mike Porcaro, and drummer Simon Phillips. Porcaro stopped performing after 2006 due to early symptoms of what was later diagnosed as ALS, taking away the use of his hands. He died in 2015, and would posthumously appear on the 2018 album Old Is New. Phillips left the band in 2014 to pursue other projects.

Other guest artists appearing on the album include then-former members vocalist Joseph Williams and keyboardist Steve Porcaro, percussionist Lenny Castro, saxophonist Tom Scott, Ian Anderson of Jethro Tull, trombonist James Pankow of Chicago, and former Chicago bassist and vocalist Jason Scheff.

== Reception ==
Professional ratings
Review scores
Source	Rating
AllMusic	3.5/5 stars

AllMusic's review of the album was mixed (3.5/5), considering the first half of the album overly safe and commenting that Toto was "a band trying to find itself during a midlife crisis." However, they praised Steve Lukather's vocals and the band's "amazing production values".

== Track listing ==
All tracks are written by David Paich, Steve Lukather, Bobby Kimball, Simon Phillips and Mike Porcaro except where noted.

No.	Title	Writer(s)	Lead vocals	Length
1.	"Falling in Between"	Paich, Lukather, Kimball, M. Porcaro, Greg Phillinganes, Phillips	Kimball and Phillinganes	4:06
2.	"Dying on My Feet"		Kimball	6:11
3.	"Bottom of Your Soul"		Lukather and Williams	6:58
4.	"King of the World"	Kimball, Lukather, Paich, Steve Porcaro, Phillips, M. Porcaro	Paich, Lukather, and Kimball	4:04
5.	"Hooked"		Kimball	4:36
6.	"Simple Life"	Lukather	Lukather	2:22
7.	"Taint Your World"		Kimball	4:01
8.	"Let It Go"	Lukather, Paich, Phillinganes, Phillips, Kimball, M. Porcaro	Phillinganes	5:00
9.	"Spiritual Man"	Paich	Paich, Kimball, and Phillinganes	5:22
10.	"No End in Sight"		Lukather and Kimball	6:10
11.	"The Reeferman" (US, Canadian and Japanese bonus track)	Lukather, M. Porcaro, Paich, Phillips	none	1:46

== Personnel ==
=== Toto ===
- Bobby Kimball – lead vocals (1, 2, 4, 5, 7, 9,10), backing vocals
- Steve Lukather – guitars, piano (6), lead vocals (3, 4, 6, 10), backing vocals
- David Paich – keyboards, lead vocals (4, 9), backing vocals
- Greg Phillinganes – keyboards, lead vocals (1, 8, 9), backing vocals
- Mike Porcaro – bass
- Simon Phillips – drums, percussion, programming

==== Additional musicians ====
- Lenny Castro – percussion (2, 3, 6, 8–10)
- Steve Porcaro – synthesizers (2, 5, 8, 10), sound design (1, 4, 5, 7, 10)
- Jason Scheff – backing vocals (1, 3, 4)
- L. Shankar – backing vocals (1, 3), violin (1)
- Joseph Williams – lead vocals (3)
- Trevor Lukather – backing vocals (5)
- James Tormé – backing vocals (5)
- Monet – backing vocals (9)
- James Pankow – trombone and horn arrangements (2)
- Ray Herrmann – tenor saxophone (2)
- Lee Thornburg – trumpet (2)
- Tom Scott – tenor saxophone (9)
- Roy Hargrove – trumpet and flugelhorn (11)

=== Technical ===
- Produced by Toto
- Engineered by Simon Phillips
- Assistant engineer – Stefan Nordin
- Additional engineers – Mike Ging and Phil Soussan (at Phantom); John Jessel and Steve Cohen (at ATS)
- Mixed by Steve MacMillan
- Mastered by Stephen Marcussen at Marcussen Mastering (Hollywood, CA)
- Artwork – Jim Evans
- Photography – Pamela Springsteen
- Project coordinator – Anita Heilig
- Management – The Fitzgerald Hartley Co.

== Charts ==
=== Weekly charts ===
Weekly chart performance for Falling in Between
Chart (2006)	Peak position
Hungarian Albums (MAHASZ)	34
