= Forgotten Toys =

Studio album by David Paich
- Released: August 19, 2022
- Recorded: 2015–2022
- Genres: Pop rock; Jazz rock; Soft rock
- Length: 29:06
- Label: The Players Club
- Producers: David Paich; Joseph Williams

Forgotten Toys is the debut studio album by David Paich, keyboardist/vocalist of the American rock band Toto. In 2022, Paich announced his debut solo album and it was released by the Players Club (Mascot Label Group) on August 19, 2022. On June 9, 2022, he released the first single titled "Spirit of the Moonrise". Paich said he plans to release more in the future and he has "some stuff lying around here", and is often "slow" because he is "methodical and a perfectionist, sometimes too much...".

== Background ==
During the initial COVID-19 lockdowns in 2020, Paich revisited some old songs and ideas that he had "carried in his head for years". This is where the title of the album comes from. This album features Joseph Williams as co-producer and additional musician and vocalist, Steve Lukather, Brian Eno, Michael McDonald, Ray Parker Jr., Don Felder, and Steve Jordan. "All the Tears That Shine" was originally featured on the 2015 Toto album Toto XIV, which featured David Paich on vocals. This version of the song features co-writer Michael Sherwood on vocals. Paich said that the album art was done by his wife, Lorraine, who was inspired after hearing Paich's original title for the album, 'Broken Toys'. She has previous experience in tabletop design for food commercials and was previously a food stylist.

== Critical reception ==
Professional ratings
Review scores
Source	Rating
American Songwriter	3.5/5
Classic Rock	3/5 stars

Forgotten Toys received some positive reviews from music critics. Lee Zimmerman of American Songwriter described the album as "a surprisingly cohesive and well-constructed set of songs", making it a "pleasure to peruse". Classic Rock's Phoebe Flys called the album "a masterfully produced celebration of a lifetime’s musical kinship" and highlighted that it includes "yacht rock’s most talented peer group" in its lineup.

== Track listing ==
No.	Title	Lyrics	Music	Producer(s)	Length
1.	"Forward"		David Paich	Paich	0:31
2.	"willibelongtoyou"	Paich; Joseph Williams	Paich; Williams	Williams; Paich	4:19
3.	"Spirit of the Moonrise"	Paich; Williams	Paich	Williams; Paich	4:52
4.	"First Time"	Paich; Williams	Paich	Williams; Paich	5:05
5.	"Queen Charade"	Paich	Paich	Williams; Paich	4:26
6.	"All the Tears That Shine"	Paich; Mike Sherwood	Paich; Sherwood	Paich	5:22
7.	"Lucy"		Paich; Mike Lang	Paich	4:31
Total length:					29:06

== Personnel ==
Musicians

- David Paich – lead vocals (tracks 2–5), keyboards (track 1), piano (tracks 2–7), organ (tracks 2, 3, 5, 7), bass (tracks 3, 5), synth (tracks 4, 6, 7)
- Gregg Bissonette – drums (tracks 2, 7)
- Lenny Castro – percussion (tracks 3, 4, 6, 7)
- Robin DiMaggio – drums and percussion (tracks 4, 6)
- Jon Diversa – horns (track 7)
- Nathan East – bass guitar (tracks 2, 4)
- David Hungate – bass guitar (tracks 3)
- Brian Eno – synthesizer (track 6)
- Don Felder – slide guitar (track 5)
- Fredrik Halland – electric guitar (track 4), background vocals (tracks 4, 6), additional electric guitar and electric bass (track 6)
- Warren Ham – saxophone (tracks 3, 5), flute (track 4), harmonica (track 5)
- Davey Johnstone – acoustic and electric guitars (track 6)
- Steve Jordan – drums (track 5)
- Pat Knox – background vocals (tracks 3, 5)
- Michael Lang – acoustic piano (track 7)
- Steve Lukather – electric guitar (tracks 2, 3, 5), electric guitar solo (track 3)
- Michael McDonald – background vocals (track 3)
- Monét Owens – background vocals (track 5)
- Elizabeth Paich – background vocals (tracks 4, 6)
- Ray Parker Jr. – guitar (track 7)
- Dean Parks – acoustic and electric guitars (tracks 2–4)
- Billy Sherwood – background vocals (track 6)
- Michael Sherwood – lead vocals (track 6)
- James Tormé – background vocals and scatting (track 7)
- Mike Valerio – upright bass (tracks 6, 7)
- Hannah Williams – background vocals (track 3)
- Joseph Williams – lead vocals (track 2), background vocals (tracks 2-4), keyboards (track 2), synth (tracks 2, 3), drum programming (track 3)
- Ray Williams – background vocals (track 3)

Technical personnel

- Joseph Williams – engineer (tracks 2-5)
- Pat Knox – engineer (tracks 3, 5, 6), additional engineering (track 2, 4, 7)
- Stefan Nordin – engineer (track 7)
- Frank Rosato – additional engineering (track 2)
- Julian Chan – additional engineering (tracks 5, 6)
- Bob Clearmountain – mixing
- Ken Freeman – additional mixing (tracks 1, 7)
- Bernie Grundman – mastering

== Charts ==
Chart performance for Forgotten Toys
Chart (2022)	Peak position
Dutch Albums (Album Top 100)	7
German Albums (Offizielle Top 100)	37
Japanese Albums (Oricon)	49
Japanese Hot Albums (Billboard Japan)	57
Scottish Albums (Official Charts)	77
Swiss Albums (Schweizer Hitparade)	19
UK Album Downloads (Official Charts)	88
UK Independent Albums (Official Charts)	24
