= George Shelby =

George Shelby may refer to:

- George Shelby, character in Uncle Tom's Cabin
- George Shelby (musician) on Santamental album
