= Transition (Steve Lukather album) =

Studio album by Steve Lukather
- Released: January 21, 2013
- Recorded: December 06, 2011 – September 2012
- Studios: Steakhouse Studios, North Hollywood and The Treehouse, North Hollywood
- Genres: Hard rock, pop rock, AOR/melodic rock, neo-prog, progressive metal
- Length: 45:55
- Label: Mascot Records
- Producers: Steve Lukather; C. J. Vanston

Steve Lukather chronology
All's Well That Ends Well (2010)	Transition (2013)	I Found the Sun Again (2021)

Singles from Transition
- 1. "Right The Wrong" Released: 2012

Transition is the seventh studio album by Steve Lukather, released on vinyl and as a jewel case CD on January 21, 2013, by Mascot Records. In Europe a limited edition Digibook was also released, containing a booklet with studio pictures and liner notes from Lukather and producer C. J. Vanston.

== Track listing ==
1. "Judgement Day" (Steve Lukather, C. J. Vanston) – 7:17
2. "Creep Motel" (S. Lukather, Vanston, Fee Waybill) – 5:46
3. "Once Again" (S. Lukather, Vanston) – 4:57
4. "Right the Wrong" (S. Lukather, Vanston, Trev Lukather) – 6:20
5. "Transition" (S. Lukather, Vanston, Steve Weingart) – 5:32
6. "Last Man Standing" (S. Lukather, Randy Goodrum) – 5:21
7. "Do I Stand Alone" (S. Lukather, Vanston) – 4:10
8. "Rest of the World" (Jack Raines, Vanston) – 4:01
9. "Smile" (Charlie Chaplin, arr. by S. Lukather, Weingart, Vanston) (Instrumental) – 2:30

== Personnel ==
- Steve Lukather – all guitars, lead vocals (1–4, 6–8), lead guitar (5), backing vocals (5–7), arrangements
- C. J. Vanston – keyboards, backing vocals (1–7), arrangements
- Steve Weingart – keyboards (5, 9), keyboard solo (5), arrangements (9)
- Trevor Lukather – muted guitar (4)
- Leland Sklar – bass (1, 2), bass solo (1)
- Renee Jones – bass (3), backing vocals (8)
- John Pierce – bass (4, 6, 7)
- Tal Wilkenfeld – bass (5)
- Nathan East – bass (8)
- Toss Panos – drums (1, 3)
- Gregg Bissonette – drums (2, 5)
- Chad Smith – drums (4)
- Eric Valentine – drums (6–8)
- Lenny Castro – percussion (2, 3, 6, 8)
- Phil Collen – backing vocals (1)
- Jenny Douglas – backing vocals (2, 7)
- Kristina Helene – backing vocals (4)
- Richard Page – backing vocals (4, 6)
- Jack Raines – backing vocals (8)

== Production ==
- Steve Lukather – producer
- C. J. Vanston – producer, engineer, mixing, studio photography
- Tina Lukather – assistant producer
- Ross Hogarth – bass and drum engineer
- John Cranfield – assistant engineer
- Adrian Van Velsen – digital editing
- Peter Doell – mastering
- Universal Mastering Studios (Los Angeles, California) – mastering location
- Roy Koch – graphic design, artwork
- Rob Shanahan – photography

== Charts ==
Chart (2013)	Peak position
German Albums Chart	29
Swedish Albums Chart	22
Finland Albums Top 50	20
Norway Albums Top 40	24
Swiss Albums Top 100	25
Dutch Albums Top 100	26
Austria Albums Top 75	28
Denmark Albums Top 40	32
France Albums Top 150	90
Billboard Heatseekers	18
