= Lukather =

Studio album by Steve Lukather
- Released: August 1989
- Recorded: 1988–1989
- Studios: Various: One on One (North Hollywood); Cherokee Studios (Hollywood); Ocean Way Recording (Los Angeles); Sunset Sound (Hollywood); Right Track Recording (New York City); The Complex (Los Angeles); Studio 55 (Hollywood); Record One (Sherman Oaks); The Village Recorder (Los Angeles); Devonshire Studios (North Hollywood); California Phase (Los Angeles)
- Genres: Hard rock; AOR; glam metal; pop rock
- Length: 58:31
- Label: CBS
- Producers: Steve Lukather; Eddie Van Halen; Richard Marx; Steve Stevens; Danny Kortchmar; Richie Zito; Randy Goodrum

Steve Lukather chronology
Lukather (1989)	Candyman (1994)

Singles from Lukather
- 1. "Swear Your Love" Released: 1989; 2. "Lonely Beat of My Heart" Released: 1989; 3. "Turns to Stone" Released: 1989 (EU)

Lukather is the first solo studio album by Toto guitarist Steve Lukather. It was released in 1989 through CBS Records internationally but was never given a U.S. release due to tensions between Lukather and Columbia Records. The album would make it to the Sverigetopplistan record chart, peaking at no. 14.

== History ==
Lukather came about after Toto had been recording and playing for eleven years and the band consensus was to take a break. Since Lukather had a number of songs written that did not appear on Toto albums, he decided to pursue a solo album. His intention was to present a dimension of his musical work that fans would not be familiar with, and he collaborated with many notable musicians. Among the people involved in Lukather were Eddie Van Halen, Steve Stevens, Richard Marx, Jan Hammer, and fellow Toto members Jeff Porcaro and David Paich.

Lukather has stated that the album is produced in a very simple manner and that one can hear a lot of ambient studio noise such as counting off on various tracks. He also credits bands Pink Floyd, Cream, Led Zeppelin, and guitarists Jimi Hendrix, David Gilmour, Jeff Beck, and Eric Clapton as influences on the album. Much of the material was debuted live in late 1988 when Lukather did a number of solo live dates in the Los Angeles area while the album was being recorded.

== Track listing ==
All tracks are written by Steve Lukather, with additional writers noted.

No.	Title	Writer(s)	Length
1.	"Twist the Knife"	Eddie Van Halen	5:24
2.	"Swear Your Love"	Richard Marx	3:58
3.	"Fall into Velvet"	Cy Curnin; Steve Stevens	9:03
4.	"Drive a Crooked Road"	Danny Kortchmar	5:20
5.	"Got My Way"	Randy Goodrum; Michael Landau	4:57
6.	"Darkest Night of the Year"	Stevens	5:19
7.	"Lonely Beat of My Heart"	Diane Warren	4:17
8.	"With a Second Chance"	Goodrum	4:36
9.	"Turns to Stone"	Goodrum	5:35
10.	"It Looks Like Rain"	Tom Kelly; Billy Steinberg	4:21
11.	"Steppin' on Top of Your World"	Kortchmar	5:41
Total length:			58:31

== Personnel ==
Adapted from album's liner notes.

- Steve Lukather – lead vocals, backing vocals (1, 2, 4, 6, 8, 9), guitars (1–3, 5–9, 11), guitar solo (3, 4, 10), "backwards" guitar (3), synthesizers (4, 7–9), keyboards (9), drum programming (9), acoustic guitar (10), 12-string guitar (10)
- Steve Stevens – guitars (3), guitar solo (3)
- Danny Kortchmar – rhythm guitar (4, 11), backing vocals (4), keyboards (11), percussion (11), sequencing (11)
- Mike Landau – guitars (5, 10)
- C.J. Vanston – keyboards (2)
- Jan Hammer – synthesizer solo (3), Hammond B3 organ (3)
- Eric Rehl – additional synthesizers and effects (3, 6)
- Randy Goodrum – synthesizers (5, 9), synthesizer programming (8), drum programming (8, 9), backing vocals (9)
- Aaron Zigman – synthesizers (5)
- Kim Bullard – keyboards (7)
- David Paich – organ (7)
- Jai Winding – keyboards (10)
- Edward Van Halen – bass (1)
- Neil Stubenhaus – bass (2, 7)
- Will Lee – bass (3, 6)
- John Pierce – bass (4, 11)
- Randy Jackson – bass (5, 10)
- Leland Sklar – bass (9)
- Carlos Vega – drums (1)
- Prairie Prince – drums (2)
- Thommy Price – drums (3, 6)
- Jeff Porcaro – drums (4, 11)
- John Keane – drums (5, 7, 10), backing vocals (5, 9)
- Lenny Castro – percussion (1, 3, 5, 10)
- Warren Ham – backing vocals (1), ad-libs (1)
- Richard Marx – backing vocals (2, 7)
- Cindy Mizelle – backing vocals (3), ad-libs (3)
- Stan Lynch – backing vocals (4, 11)
- Tom Kelly – backing vocals (5, 10)
- Tommy Funderburk – backing vocals (7)
- Ivan Neville – backing vocals (11)

=== Technical ===
- Produced by Steve Lukather
- Co-produced by Edward Van Halen (1), Richard Marx (2), Steve Stevens (3, 6), Danny Kortchmar (4, 11), Randy Goodrum (5, 8, 9), Richie Zito (7), Tom Kelly (10), Billy Steinberg (10)
- Assistant engineers – Charlie Brocco, Paul Dieter, Clark Germain, Mike Kloster, Jay Lean, Bob Loftus, Danny Mormando, Rail Rogut, Duane Seykora, Brett Swain, Mike Tacci, Rick Clifford, Mike Bosley, Ken Felton
- Production coordinator and contractor – Shari Sutcliffe
- Creative direction and design – Doug Brown
- Art direction – An Rafferty
- Photography – Jeff Katz
- Management – The Fitzgerald/Hartley Company

== Charts ==
Chart (1989)	Peak position
Dutch Albums (Album Top 100)	57
Swedish Albums (Sverigetopplistan)	14
