= Ever Changing Times =

Studio album by Steve Lukather
- Released: February 25, 2008
- Recorded: 2007
- Studio: The Steakhouse (North Hollywood)
- Genres: Hard rock; neo-prog; pop rock
- Length: 54:32
- Labels: (Europe) Frontiers Records (Japan) Ride Records (Philippines) Ride Records/GMA Records
- Producers: Steve Lukather; Steve MacMillan

Steve Lukather chronology
Santamental (2003)	Ever Changing Times (2008)	All's Well That Ends Well (2010)

Ever Changing Times is the fifth studio album by American musician Steve Lukather. In March 2008, a site was launched in order to promote the album. According to Lukather, the album shows a lot of his influences and music he likes.

== Track listing ==
All tracks are written by Steve Lukather and Randy Goodrum, except where noted.

No.	Title	Writer(s)	Length
1.	"Ever Changing Times"		5:29
2.	"The Letting Go"		5:52
3.	"New World"	S. Lukather; Goodrum; Trevor Lukather	4:32
4.	"Tell Me What You Want from Me"	S. Lukather; Goodrum; T. Lukather; Phil Soussan	5:13
5.	"I Am"		3:15
6.	"Jammin' with Jesus"	John Sloman	5:55
7.	"Stab in the Back"		5:59
8.	"Never Ending Nights"		5:35
9.	"Ice Bound"		4:19
10.	"How Many Zeros"	S. Lukather; Jeff Babko; Stan Lynch	4:33
11.	"The Truth"	S. Lukather	3:50
Total length:			54:32

== Personnel ==
==== Musicians ====
- Steve Lukather – vocals (1–10), guitars (1–10), guitar solo (11)
- Jeff Babko – keyboards (1–6, 8–10), synthesizers (2, 4–7), Rhodes (7)
- Randy Goodrum – synthesizers (1, 2, 5, 10), backing vocals (5)
- Jyro Xhan – synthesizers (1), atmospheric sounds (1)
- Steve MacMillan – additional synthesizers (1, 3, 5, 9)
- Greg Mathieson – Hammond organ (6, 7)
- Steve Weingart – synthesizer fills (7), synth solo (9)
- Olle Romo – synthesizers (8)
- Steve Porcaro – keyboards (11), orchestration (11), arrangements (11)
- Trevor Lukather – guitars (3), backing vocals (3, 6), guitar riffs (4)
- John Pierce – bass (1)
- Leland Sklar – bass (2, 3, 5–10)
- Phil Soussan – bass (4), backing vocals (4)
- Abe Laboriel Jr. – drums (1–10)
- Lenny Castro – percussion (2, 6–10)
- Joseph Williams – backing vocals (1, 3, 6, 8, 9)
- Bernard Fowler – backing vocals (3, 6)
- Bill Champlin – backing vocals (6, 10)
- Sharolette Gibson – backing vocals (6)
- Tina Lukather – backing vocals (7), ooh's and laughter (7)

==== Technical ====
- Produced by Steve Lukather and Steve MacMillan
- Executive producers – Randy Goodrum and Yoshihiro Ricky Miyagi (Ride Records)
- Recorded and mixed by Steve MacMillan
- Assistant engineers – John Silas Cranfield and Ken Eisennagel
- Mastered by Stephen Marcussen at Marcussen Mastering (Hollywood, CA)
- A&R – Naoki Nomura and Micky Suzuki
- Photography – Robert Knight and Maryanne Bilham-Knight
- Creative direction – Ricky Rodriguez
- CD artwork – Satoshi Hasegawa (Circle Design Inc.)
- Album coordination – Rhoda Neal (for Steve Lukather) and Amy McGuire Lynch (for Sonny Abelardo)
- Management – Sonny Abelardo

== Charts ==
Weekly chart performance for Ever Changing Times
Chart (2009)	Peak position
Hungarian Albums (MAHASZ)	32
