= Los Lobotomys (album) =

Studio album by Los Lobotomys
- Released: November 30, 1989
- Recorded: April 29, 1989; May 12–16, 1989 (Mixing)
- Studios: The Complex (Los Angeles); Mad Hatter Studios (Los Angeles)
- Genres: Jazz fusion; blues rock
- Length: 61:59
- Label: Creatchy
- Producers: David Garfield; Alan Hirschberg; Akira Okamura

Los Lobotomys chronology
Los Lobotomys (1989)	Candyman (1994)

Reissue cover

Los Lobotomys is the debut studio album by American rock band Los Lobotomys, a side project featuring members of Toto and other Los Angeles session musicians. It was released only in Japan on November 30, 1989, on Creatchy records, a label created by David Garfield. It was later released in Germany and Sweden on various other labels, and officially reissued by Garfield in 1997.

== Background ==
The band originally formed in 1986 for the purposes of performing live at The Baked Potato jazz club. It was an offshoot of Garfield's band Karizma, which included many of the same members. The lineup originally consisted of keyboardist David Garfield and guitarist Steve Lukather with a rotating cast of session musicians who were available to perform, including, bassists John Peña, Nathan East, Jimmy Johnson, and Will Lee, saxophonists Larry Klimas and Brandon Fields, percussionists Lenny Castro and Luis Conte, and drummers Jeff Porcaro, Carlos Vega, Gregg Bissonette. After Porcaro's death in 1992, the band evolved into a core lineup of Lukather, Garfield, Peña, and Simon Phillips, occasionally with Klimas and percussionist Chris Trujillo. The band also performed at other local clubs such as blǎk n blōō and The Palomino. They remained active until 1999.

== Track listing ==
No.	Title	Writer(s)	Length
1.	"Dismemberment"	David Garfield; Lenny Castro	6:14
2.	"Oozer"	Garfield; Carlos Vega	7:08
3.	"Purple Haze"	Jimi Hendrix	0:41
4.	"Big Bone"	Garfield; Jeff Porcaro	6:38
5.	"Jorainbo"	Garfield; Joe Sample	6:54
6.	"Lobotomy Stew"	Garfield; Steve Lukather	8:12
7.	"Little Wing"	Hendrix	5:43
8.	"Smell Yourself"	Lukather	5:12
9.	"All Blues"	Miles Davis	15:17
Total length:			61:59

== Personnel ==
=== Musicians ===
- David Garfield – keyboards, synthesizers
- Joe Sample – MIDI acoustic grand piano (5, 9)
- Steve Lukather – guitar
- Will Lee – bass
- Carlos Vega – drums (1), electric drums (2–5)
- Jeff Porcaro – drums (2–7), electric drums (9)
- Vinnie Colaiuta – drums (8, 9)
- Lenny Castro – electric drums (1), percussion (2–9)
- Brandon Fields – alto saxophone (2, 4–9), Yamaha WX7 (1)

=== Technical ===
- Produced by David Garfield, Alan Hirschberg, and Akira Okamura
- Executive producer – Zensuke Watanabe
- Engineered by Alan Hirshberg
- Assistant engineers – Duane Seykora and Craig Porteils (recording); Robert Read and Steve Lukather (mixing)
- Technicians – John Herse, John Cregar (keyboard), Bob Bradshaw (guitar), Ross Garfield (drums)
- Production manager – Sonny Alberado
- Production coordinator – Masa Kadono
- Production assistants – Susan Garfield, John Cregar, Terry Cooley, and Jimmy Williamson
- Cover painting – Takayuki Terakado
- Art direction – Tohko Akiwa
- Design – Takeo Usui
- Photography – William Hames
- Image illustration and logotype – Jeff Porcaro and Lenny Castro
- Direction – Kaz Hoshino
