= All's Well That Ends Well (Steve Lukather album) =

Studio album by Steve Lukather
- Released: October 11, 2010
- Recorded: Steakhouse Studios and The Treehouse (North Hollywood, California).
- Genres: Hard rock, neo-prog, pop rock
- Length: 47:20
- Label: Mascot
- Producers: Steve Lukather, C.J. Vanston and Steve MacMillan

Steve Lukather chronology
Ever Changing Times (2008)	All's Well That Ends Well (2010)	Transition (2013)

Singles from All Well's That End Well
- 1. "Can't Look Back" Released: 2010; 2. "Watching The World" Released: 2011

All's Well That Ends Well is the sixth studio album by American musician Steve Lukather, released on vinyl and as a jewel case CD on October 11, 2010 by Mascot Records. In Europe a limited edition Digibook was also released, containing a booklet with studio pictures and liner notes from Lukather and producer CJ Vanston, as well as a personal message from Lukather. The album is dedicated to his late mother Kathy.

== Track listing ==
1. "Darkness In My World" (Steve Lukather, CJ Vanston) – 6:59
2. "On My Way Home" (Steve Lukather, CJ Vanston) – 5:22
3. "Can't Look Back" (Steve Lukather, CJ Vanston) – 4:43
4. "Don't Say It's Over" (Steve Lukather, CJ Vanston) – 5:39
5. "Flash In The Pan" (Steve Lukather, Fee Waybill) – 4:54
6. "Watching The World" (Steve Lukather, CJ Vanston) – 4:51
7. "You'll Remember" (Steve Lukather, Steve Weingart, Fee Waybill) – 5:15
8. "Brody's" (Steve Lukather, Randy Goodrum) – 5:36
9. "Tumescent" (Steve Lukather, Steve Weingart, Carlitos Del Puerto, Eric Valentine) – 4:02

== Personnel ==
- Steve Lukather – all guitars, lead vocals, backing vocals, arrangements
- CJ Vanston – keyboards, atmospheric sounds, backing vocals, arrangements
- Steve Weingart – keyboards
- Trevor Lukather – "power" guitars (4)
- Carlitos Del Puerto – bass
- Eric Valentine – drums
- Lenny Castro – percussion
- Jake Hays – handclaps and "heys"
- Glenn Berger – saxophone (2)
- Joseph Williams – backing vocals
- Bernard Fowler – backing vocals (1)
- Tina Lukather – backing vocals (1)
- Jory Steinberg – backing vocals (1, 2, 8)
- Phil Collen – backing vocals (3, 4)
- Fee Waybill – backing vocals (5, 7)

== Production ==
- Steve Lukather – producer, liner notes
- Steve MacMillan – producer, recording
- CJ Vanston – producer, additional recording, mixing, liner notes
- Adrian Van Velsen – music mix preparation
- Jay Asher – Logic Pro consultant
- Gavin Lurssen – mastering
- Ruben Cohen – mastering assistant
- Lurssen Mastering (Los Angeles, California) – mastering location
- Nigel Dick – art direction, design
- Ash Newell – photography
- Anita Heilig – management
- Mark Hartley – management

== Charts ==
Chart (2010)	Peak position
German Albums Chart	31
Swedish Albums Chart	30
