= El Grupo =

El Grupo is a jazz fusion band founded by session musician and Toto guitarist Steve Lukather. The band also features Steve Weingart on keyboards, Oskar Cartaya on bass, and Joey Heredia on drums. The band primarily tours jazz clubs in the United States and Europe and is known for highly improvisational sets that vary widely from show to show. El Grupo recorded one album, in 2005, entitled El Grupo Live.

In the autumn 2006, the song "I'm Buzzed", from a live recording of El Grupo, was contributed to the album project Artists for Charity - Guitarists 4 the Kids, produced by Slang Productions, to assist World Vision Canada in helping underprivileged kids in need.
