= Bridges (Steve Lukather album) =

Studio album by Steve Lukather
- Released: June 16, 2023
- Genres: Pop rock; melodic rock
- Length: 35:45
- Label: The Players Club
- Producers: Joseph Williams; Trev Lukather; Steve Lukather (exec.)

Steve Lukather chronology
I Found the Sun Again (2021)	Bridges (2023)

Singles from Bridges
- 1. "When I See You Again" Released: April 12, 2023; 2. "Someone" Released: May 24, 2023

Bridges is the ninth studio album by Steve Lukather, released by The Players Club (Mascot Label Group) on June 16, 2023. The album features Toto bandmates Joseph Williams and David Paich, as well as noted alumni Simon Phillips, Leland Sklar and Shannon Forrest.

== Background ==
The album followed a lawsuit filed by Susan Porcaro-Goings (Jeff Porcaro's widow) against Lukather and David Paich, the sole directors of Toto Corporation, because she had not been paid money she believed was due her late husband's estate. As a result, Toto did not release any new studio material. In an April 2023 interview, Lukather stated "As Toto will never record another studio album, this is as close as we will get" and that he sees it "as a bridge between [his] solo music and Toto Music."

== Track listing ==
All tracks feature Joseph Williams; with tracks 2, 3, 5, 7, and 8 featuring David Paich.

No.	Title	Writer(s)	Length
1.	"Far from Over"	Trevor Lukather; Steve Lukather; Joseph Williams	3:58
2.	"Not My Kind of People"	S. Lukather; David Paich; Williams; Stan Lynch	3:56
3.	"Someone"	S. Lukather; Williams; Paich	4:09
4.	"All Forevers Must End"	S. Lukather; Randy Goodrum	4:20
5.	"When I See You Again"	S. Lukather; Williams; Paich; Lynch	4:55
6.	"Take My Love"	Steve Maggiora; Warren Mordaunt Huart	5:23
7.	"Burning Bridges"	S. Lukather; Lynch; Paich; Williams	4:00
8.	"I'll Never Know"	S. Lukather; Williams	5:04
Total length:			35:45

== Personnel ==
- Steve Lukather – guitars (all tracks), bass (tracks 3, 5), piano (track 4), lead vocals (all tracks)
- Trev Lukather – guitars (track 1), bass (track 1), background vocals (track 1), synths (track 1)
- Joseph Williams – background vocals (all tracks), synths (tracks 1, 2, 6), keyboards (tracks 3–5, 7, 8), percussion (tracks 3, 4, 7)
- David Paich – keyboards (tracks 2, 3, 5, 7, 8)
- Steve Maggiora – keyboards (track 6), background vocals (track 6)
- Leland Sklar – bass (tracks 2, 4, 7)
- Jorgen Carlsson – bass (tracks 6, 8)
- Simon Phillips – drums (tracks 1, 2, 5, 7)
- Shannon Forrest – drums (tracks 3, 4, 6, 8)

Technical

- Joseph Williams – production (tracks 2-8)
- Trev Lukather – production (track 1)
- Steve Lukather – executive producer
- Ken Freeman – engineering, mixing
- John Greenham – mastering
- Doug Brown – album design
- Shaz Rydstedt – AI arts tech
- Alessandro Solca – photography
- Megan Gagnon – packaging

== Charts ==
Chart performance for Bridges
Chart (2023)	Peak position
Austrian Albums (Ö3 Austria)	30
Belgian Albums (Ultratop Wallonia)	138
Dutch Albums (Album Top 100)	5
French Albums (SNEP)	105
German Albums (Offizielle Top 100)	27
Japanese Albums (Oricon)	27
Japanese Hot Albums (Billboard Japan)	27
Scottish Albums (Official Charts)	45
Swiss Albums (Schweizer Hitparade)	11
UK Album Downloads (Official Charts)	40
UK Independent Albums (Official Charts)	15
US Top Album Sales (Billboard)	73
US Top Current Album Sales (Billboard)	44
