= Luke (album) =

Studio album by Steve Lukather
- Released: October 28, 1997
- Recorded: 1996–1997
- Studio: The Steakhouse (North Hollywood)
- Genres: Hard rock; heavy metal
- Length: 59:33
- Labels: Columbia; Miramar (US)
- Producers: Steve Lukather; Tom Fletcher

Steve Lukather chronology
Candyman (1994)	Luke (1997)	No Substitutions: Live in Osaka (2001)

Singles from Luke
- 1. "Hate Everything About U" Released: 1997

Luke is the third solo studio album by American musician Steve Lukather, released on October 28, 1997. It was a much different and more introspective album than Lukather's previous two solo efforts. The album is a concentrated collection of many of Lukather's musical influences, and he deliberately let those influences come out on the album. Luke was recorded mostly in live sessions with minimal overdubbing and processing afterward. It features instrumentation not heard on previous Lukather albums such as pedal steel, harmonicas, Mellotrons, and experimental guitar, bass, and drum sounds.

The US version of Luke includes a version of the Jeff Beck song "The Pump" which was recorded live in Stuttgart, Germany on June 30, 1997 during the pre-promotional tour of the album. The song "Hate Everything About You" was released as a single.

== Track listing ==
All tracks are written by Steve Lukather and Phil Soussan, except where noted.

No.	Title	Writer(s)	Length
1.	"The Real Truth"	Lukather; Fee Waybill	5:10
2.	"Broken Machine"		4:54
3.	"Tears of My Own Shame"		5:38
4.	"Love the Things You Hate"		5:44
5.	"Hate Everything About U"	Lukather; Rodney Crowell	5:56
6.	"Reservations to Live (The Way It Is)"	Lukather; Waybill	4:49
7.	"Don't Hang Me On"		4:40
8.	"Always Be There for Me"	Lukather	5:38
9.	"Open Your Heart"	Lukather; Randy Goodrum	4:27
10.	"Bag O' Tales"		5:50
11.	"Bluebird"	Stephen Stills	6:42
12.	"The Pump (Live)*"	Simon Phillips; Tony Hymas	9:33
Total length:			59:33

* US and Japanese bonus track

== Personnel ==
Adapted from album’s liner notes.

=== Musicians ===
- Steve Lukather – lead vocals, all guitars (1–4, 7, 8, 10–12), Wurlitzer (1, 8), Mellotron (1, 7), keyboards (2), Hammond (8), electric sitar (4), electric and acoustic guitars (5, 6, 9), harmonica (5), backing vocals (5, 6, 8–11), arrangements
- Jim Cox – Hammond (1, 5, 6), Wurlitzer (5), Fender Rhodes (6)
- David Paich – Hammond (8), Wurlitzer (9)
- Brett Tuggle – keyboards (12)
- Jay Dee Maness – pedal steel guitar (5, 6)
- John Pierce – bass (1, 5, 6, 8, 11)
- Phil Soussan – bass (2–4, 7, 10, 12), backing vocals (2, 4, 7, 10, 12)
- Pino Palladino – bass (9)
- Gregg Bissonette – drums, percussion (5)
- Maxi Anderson – backing vocals (3)
- Alfie Silas Durio – backing vocals (3)
- Tom Fletcher – arrangements

=== Technical ===
- Produced by Steve Lukather and Tom Fletcher
- Engineered by Tom Fletcher and Bill Smith
- Assistant engineer – Bodie Olmos
- Second engineers – Dave Nottingham and Lee Bench
- Mixed by Elliot Scheiner at The Village Recorder (Los Angeles, CA)
- Mastered by Stephen Marcussen at Precision Mastering (Hollywood, CA)
- Guitar tech – Gavin Menzies
- Production coordinator – Anita Heilig
- Photography – Robert Knight
- Album design – WorldWest Communications
- Creative direction – Doug Brown
- Art direction – Eric Scott
- Mangement – The Fitzgerald Hartley Company
