= I Found the Sun Again =

Studio album by Steve Lukather
- Released: February 26, 2021
- Recorded: February 2020
- Studio: Steakhouse (North Hollywood, Los Angeles)
- Length: 50:20
- Label: The Players Club
- Producer: Ken Freeman, Steve Lukather

Steve Lukather chronology
Transition (2013)	I Found the Sun Again (2021)	Bridges (2023)

Singles from I Found the Sun Again
- 1. "Run to Me" Released: August 20, 2020; 2. "Serpent Soul" Released: December 3, 2020; 3. "I Found the Sun Again" Released: January 21, 2021

Professional ratings
Review scores
Source	Rating
American Songwriter	4/5 stars
Classic Rock	3/5 stars
Uncut	6/10

I Found the Sun Again is the eighth studio album by Steve Lukather, released by The Players Club (Mascot Label Group). It was released on February 26, 2021, the same day as his bandmate from Toto, Joseph Williams, released his album Denizen Tenant under the same label.

This is Lukather's first solo studio album in eight years, following Transition (2013), marking the longest gap between two albums to date.

== Background ==
The then current lineup of Toto played their last show on October 20, 2019, before breaking. Tensions were rising within the band and its management because of a lawsuit Susan Porcaro-Goings (Jeff Porcaro's widow) had against Lukather and David Paich, the sole directors of Toto Corporation, because she hadn't been paid money due her former husband's estate. This, according to Lukather, drove a wedge between him and then-member of Toto Steve Porcaro. Furthermore, Paich's health was pretty fragile so he wasn't able to tour.

After this situation, Lukather says that he and Joseph Williams were "the only ones who wanted to keep working". As Williams was already working on a solo album, Lukather decided to release one himself too, with both of them collaborating on each other's efforts.

== Recording ==
Lukather desired to do an old-school, early 70s vibe record. In his own words: "I wanted to see if I could do it the way we used to do it". In order to achieve that, the whole album was recorded in eight days in February 2020, "recording a song a day", with no rehearsals, demos, click tracks or computers. As claimed by Lukather: "all that stuff you're hearing is being played live", including the solos. There were "very minimal overdubs", specifically some double-guitar parts and the vocals. In an interview with MusicRadar, Lukather described the recording process as the easiest and most enjoyable of his career to date.

Furthermore, Lukather says that "not everything was written out". Jeff Babko and him had co-written some stuff as a "good road map", plus "some stuff that we figured that was needed in the songs and the right voicings", but the majority of the work was improvised.

The band hired for the recordings included Gregg Bissonette on drums, Jorgen Carlsson and John Pierce on bass, and David Paich and Jeff Babko on keyboards. Then, in Lukather's words, Joseph Williams "took it home and layered a few backgrounds".

== Songs ==
Of the eight tracks, there are five original songs, as well as three covers chosen by Lukather as "an homage to the people that I love": "The Low Spark of High Heeled Boys" by Traffic, Joe Walsh’s "Welcome To The Club" and "Bridge of Sighs" by Robin Trower. According to Lukather, he took the cover songs first "because that was gonna set the tone of what I wanted to write pretty much for the record". These three were songs that he "played in junior and high school in bands" and influenced him.

With "The Low Spark of High Heeled Boys", Lukather said that he "wanted to play and stretch out". He also denoted that this version includes "one of the greatest piano solos" that he's heard of in his life by Jeff Babko, and that David Paich plays a great "Steve Winwood organ solo".

As stated by Lukather, Walsh "really dug" the cover of "Welcome to the Club" included in the album.

About "Bridge of Sighs", Lukather said that he chose that song because "Robin [Trower] doesn't get enough love" and he "wanted to capture that era when it was recorded in the early '70s". He has also affirmed that it's a great and fun song to play, that he loves the lyrics and the vibe of the song, and that "not a lot of people have done it" as far as he knows.

Looking at the original songs, the album starts with "Along for the Ride". Lukather has indicated that he wanted it to be punchy and that he "didn't want people to think that I'd lost my rock and roll sense". He has also acknowledged that "there's probably a bit of Jeff Beck in there". Andy Greene of Rolling Stone has written that the lyrics of this song show the "frustration and anger he's felt over the past couple of years", alluding to the lawsuit and the end of the previous incarnation of Toto.

According to Greene, "things get even more bitter on 'Serpent Soul'", the next song on the album. Lukather said about it that "we wanted to just write something swampy" and that it's his tribute to Little Feat.

== Track listing ==
No.	Title	Writer(s)	Length
1.	"Along for the Ride"	Jeff Babko; Stan Lynch; Steve Lukather	4:56
2.	"Serpent Soul"	Babko; Joseph Williams; Lynch; Lukather	4:55
3.	"The Low Spark of High Heeled Boys"	Jim Capaldi; Steve Winwood	10:36
4.	"Journey Through"	Babko	5:55
5.	"Welcome to the Club"	Joe Walsh	5:57
6.	"I Found the Sun Again"	Babko; Williams; Lukather	6:18
7.	"Run to Me"	David Paich; Williams; Lukather	3:19
8.	"Bridge of Sighs"	Robin Trower	8:24

== Personnel ==
All credits sourced from the album's liner notes.

- Steve Lukather – guitars (all tracks), lead vocals (tracks 1–3, 5–8)
- Jeff Babko – synths (tracks 1, 5, 6, 8), keys (track 1), Wurli Rhodes (track 2), piano (track 3), Rhodes piano (tracks 3, 4, 6), effects (tracks 3, 6, 8), organ (track 5)
- David Paich – organ (tracks 1, 3, 4, 6, 8), piano (tracks 2, 5)
- Gregg Bissonette – drums (tracks 1–6, 8)
- Ringo Starr – drums, tambourine (track 7)
- Jorgen Carlsson – bass (tracks 1–4, 6, 8)
- John Pierce – bass (tracks 5, 7)
- Joseph Williams – background vocals (tracks 1, 2, 6, 7), all keys (track 7), strings (track 7), horn arrangements (track 7)

Technical

- Ken Freeman, Steve Lukather – production
- Joseph Williams – co-production (track 7)
- Ken Freeman – engineering, mixing
- Brendan Collins, Ryan Potesta – assistants
- Bruce Sugar – additional recording
- Gavin Lurssen, Reuben Cohen – mastering
- Roy Koch – artwork
- Alex Solca – photography

== Charts ==
Weekly chart performance for I Found the Sun Again
Chart (2021)	Peak position
Austrian Albums (Ö3 Austria)	16
Belgian Albums (Ultratop Flanders)	161
Belgian Albums (Ultratop Wallonia)	87
Dutch Albums (Album Top 100)	21
French Albums (SNEP)	141
German Albums (Offizielle Top 100)	16
Scottish Albums (OCC)	63
Swiss Albums (Schweizer Hitparade)	10
UK Independent Albums (OCC)	16
US Top Album Sales (Billboard)	72
US Top Current Album Sales (Billboard)	41
