= Santamental =

SantaMental

Studio album by Steve Lukather
- Released: October 13, 2003; November 6, 2026 (reissue)
- Recorded: June 17–24, 2002
- Studio: The Steakhouse (North Hollywood)
- Genres: Rock; jazz fusion; Christmas music
- Length: 43:12
- Labels: Bop City Records; Tossed Salad Man Records (reissue)
- Producers: Steve Lukather; Elliot Scheiner

Steve Lukather chronology
No Substitutions: Live in Osaka (2001)	SantaMental (2003)	Ever Changing Times (2008)

SantaMental is the fourth studio album by American rock guitarist Steve Lukather, released on October 13, 2003. On November 6, 2026, the album was reissued on CD, vinyl, and digitally, with one hundred percent of the proceeds going to the Ed Asner Family Center in Van Nuys, California.

== History ==
When Lukather's record company, Bop City Records, approached him about recording a Christmas album, he quipped, "Why me? Do I look like Father Christmas to you mofos?" The company wanted him to do the record knowing he would approach the project with a unique angle and produce something different from the typical Christmas album. Lukather recruited keyboardist Jeff Babko and guitarist Larry Carlton, who Lukather had worked with previously, to help arrange the songs. The result was a challenge to Lukather, who had to be creative to turn the traditionally simple songs into something interesting for listeners.

The musicians Lukather chose for SantaMental, most of whom are hard rock veterans, lent a heavy feel to the album. Van Halen recorded guitar tracks for "Joy to the World" after not having been in the studio for some time but immediately made an impression on Lukather with his level of playing. Vai provided guitar work for "Carol of the Bells" along with Lukather's son Trevor, then 14 years old. Slash, who recorded his part in one take, played on the Lukather/Stan Lynch composition "Broken Heart for Christmas." Lukather spoke highly of Slash after the project, calling him the "Keith Richards of our generation." Famous session guitarist Michael Landau played on the song "Look Out For Angels," and there is a previously unreleased version of "Jingle Bells" sung by Sammy Davis Jr.

== Track listing ==
All songs arranged by Steve Lukather and Jeff Babko, except "The Christmas Song" arranged by Lukather and Larry Carlton.

No.	Title	Writer(s)	Length
1.	"Joy to the World"	Isaac Watts	3:07
2.	"Greensleeves"	Traditional	6:58
3.	"Jingle Bells"	James Lord Pierpont	2:19
4.	"Carol of the Bells"	Mykola Leontovych	4:42
5.	"Broken Heart for Christmas"	Lukather; Stan Lynch	4:09
6.	"Angels We Have Heard on High"	Traditional	4:55
7.	"Winter Wonderland" (duet with Edgar Winter)	Felix Bernard; Richard Bernhard Smith	4:05
8.	"Look Out for Angels"	Lukather; Jeff Babko	5:19
9.	"Silent Night"	Franz Xaver Gruber	4:33
10.	"Goodbye"		0:47
11.	"The Christmas Song"	Mel Tormé; Robert Wells	2:16
Total length:			43:12

Track 10 is only on the CD release.

== Personnel ==
=== Musicians ===
- Steve Lukather – guitar, 1st guitar solo (1, 4), 3rd guitar solo (1), 2nd guitar solo (8), lead vocals (3–5, 7, 8), backing vocals (3)
- Jeff Babko – keyboards (1, 5, 6–8), Rhodes (2, 4, 9), synthesizers (2, 4), piano (3), trombone (3, 7), rhythm arrangements (3), horn arrangements (3, 7), conductor (3, 7), 2nd guitar solo (4), Hammond (4, 7), backing vocals (3), vocals (4)
- Eddie Van Halen – guitar (1), 2nd and 4th guitar solos (1)
- Steve Vai – 3rd guitar solo (4)
- Trevor Lukather – rhythm guitar (4)
- Slash – guitar (5)
- Mike Landau – guitar (8), 1st guitar solo (8)
- John Pierce – bass (1–9)
- Gregg Bissonette – drums (1–9), trumpet (3)
- Simon Phillips – tambourine (1)
- Lenny Castro – percussion (2, 5–8), bell tree (3), backing vocals (3)
- Edgar Winter – saxophone (2, 7), co-lead vocals (7)
- George Shelby – saxophone (3, 7)
- Walt Fowler – trumpet (3, 7)
- Sammy Davis Jr. – sampled vocals (3)
- Scott Hamilton – backing vocals (3)
- Bob Babko – backing vocals (3)
- Chie Castro – backing vocals (3)
- Ben Osgood – backing vocals (3)

=== Technical ===
- Produced by Steve Lukather and Elliot Scheiner
- Engineered and mixed by Elliot Scheiner
- Executive producer – Steve Saxton
- Photography – Robert Knight
- Art direction and design – Gina Zangla
- Management – Anita Heilig (The Fitzgerald Hartley Co.)
