= No Substitutions: Live in Osaka =

Live album by Larry Carlton and Steve Lukather
- Released: March 20, 2001
- Recorded: November 1998
- Venue: The Blue Note (Osaka, Japan)
- Genre: Jazz pop
- Length: 52:27
- Label: Favored Nations
- Producer: Steve Vai; Steve Lukather

Larry Carlton chronology
Fingerprints (2000)	No Substitutions: Live in Osaka (2001)	Deep Into It (2001)

Steve Lukather chronology
Luke (1997)	No Substitutions: Live in Osaka (2001)	Santamental (2003)

Professional ratings
Review scores
Source	Rating
Allmusic	4/5 stars

No Substitutions: Live in Osaka is a live album by Larry Carlton and Steve Lukather, released in 2001 through Favored Nations. In 2002, the album won Carlton and Lukather, along with engineer/recorder Yoshiyasu Kumada and editor/producer Steve Vai, the Grammy Award for Best Pop Instrumental Album.

== Track listing ==
1. "The Pump" (Hymas, Phillips) – 14:28
2. "Don't Give It Up" (Carlton) – 6:38
3. "(It Was) Only Yesterday" (Carlton) – 12:09
4. "All Blues" (Davis) – 14:06
5. "Room 335" (Carlton) – 5:06

== Personnel ==
- Larry Carlton – guitar (left side)
- Steve Lukather – guitar (right side)
- Rick Jackson – keyboards
- Chris Kent – bass
- Gregg Bissonette – drums, percussion

== Production ==
- Steve Lukather – producer
- Steve Vai – producer, mixing, editing
- Yoshiyasu Kumada – recording
- TakeshI Sasaki – recording assistant
- Mark Dawson – second engineer
- Neil Citron – mixing, editing
- The Mothership (Hollywood, California) – mixing location
- The Harmony Hut (Encino, California) – mixing location
- Ken Blaustein – art direction, art production, photography
- Gina Zangla – design, cover illustration
- Robert Knight – photography
- Kenju Uyama – photography
- Fitzgerald Hartley Co. – management
- Sonny Abelardo – album coordinator, sound mixer, tour manager
- Ric "Reg" Britton – guitar technician, stage manager
- Josh Henson – guitar technician, bass technician
