= Candyman (album) =

Studio album by Steve Lukather / Los Lobotomys
- Released: March 29, 1994
- Recorded: March–November 1993
- Studios: Capitol (Hollywood); Devonshire (North Hollywood)
- Genres: Hard rock; blues rock; jazz fusion; heavy metal; neo-prog; progressive metal
- Length: 72:59
- Labels: Columbia (International); Viceroy (US)
- Producers: Steve Lukather; Tom Fletcher

Steve Lukather chronology
Lukather (1989)	Candyman (1994)	Luke (1997)

Singles from Candyman
- 1. "Hero with a 1,000 Eyes" Released: 1994; 2. "Borrowed Time" Released: 1994

Candyman is the second studio album by American rock musician Steve Lukather, released on March 29, 1994, by Columbia Records internationally and Viceroy Music in the U.S. It was a collaboration of musicians who were for the most part also in Lukather's band Los Lobotomys. Toto members Simon Phillips and David Paich participated as well as David Garfield, John Peña, Chris Trujillo, Lenny Castro, Larry Klimas, Fee Waybill, Richard Page, and Paul Rodgers. Lukather mostly recorded the album live with little overdubbing.

There was some confusion about whether Candyman was a Steve Lukather album or a Los Lobotomys album. The Japanese and US releases of Candyman were under the Los Lobotomys name rather than Lukather's; the Japanese release also featured a version of the Hendrix song "Red House." The European release of Candyman was credited to Lukather alone. Additionally, the touring band for the album was sometimes introduced as "Steve Lukather and Los Lobotomys" and sometimes as just "Los Lobotomys."

Two singles were released from the album in Europe: "Hero with a 1,000 Eyes" backed by "Party in Simon's Pants", and "Borrowed Time" included "Red House" and "Freedom" as a B-sides.

== Track listing ==
All tracks are written by Steve Lukather, David Garfield, and Fee Waybill, except where noted.

Side one
No.	Title	Writer(s)	Length
1.	"Hero with a 1,000 Eyes"		6:31
2.	"Freedom"	Jimi Hendrix	4:08
3.	"Extinction Blues"		4:59
4.	"Born Yesterday"		7:08
5.	"Never Walk Alone"	Lukather; Garfield	9:42
6.	"Party in Simon's Pants"	Lukather; Simon Phillips	5:45
7.	"Borrowed Time"		7:20
8.	"Never Let Them See You Cry"		5:03
9.	"Froth"	Lukather; Garfield	9:41
10.	"The Bomber"	Joe Walsh; Dale Peters; Jim Fox; Vince Guaraldi	5:32
11.	"Song for Jeff"	Lukather; Garfield	7:07
12.	"Red House*"	Simon Phillips; Tony Hymas	5:07
Total length:			72:59

* US and Japanese bonus track

== Personnel ==
=== Band ===
- Steve Lukather – guitars, lead vocals, backing vocals
- David Garfield – keyboards, synthesizers, piano
- John Peña – bass
- Simon Phillips – drums
- Chris Trujillo – percussion
- Lenny Castro – percussion
- Larry Klimas – saxophone

==== Additional musicians ====
- David Paich – organ (5)
- Fee Waybill – backing vocals
- Richard Page - backing vocals
- Kevin Curry – backing vocals
- Paul Rodgers – guest vocals (2)

=== Technical ===
- Produced by Steve Lukather and Tom Fletcher
- Recorded and mixed by Tom Fletcher
- Mastered by Arnie Acosta at A&M (Hollywood, California)
- Second engineers – Lee Waters and Erich Gobel
- Assistant engineers – Sean O'Dwyer, Peter Doell, Bill Smith, and Charlie Paakkari
- Technicians – Joe Birkman, Mike Guerra, Jeff Minnich, Alberto Coronel, Tom Ketterer, Danny Thomas
- Album package – Gina Zangla
- Cover photography – Jack Andersen
- Photography – Armando Gallo
