= Joseph Williams (musician) =

American singer, songwriter, and composer

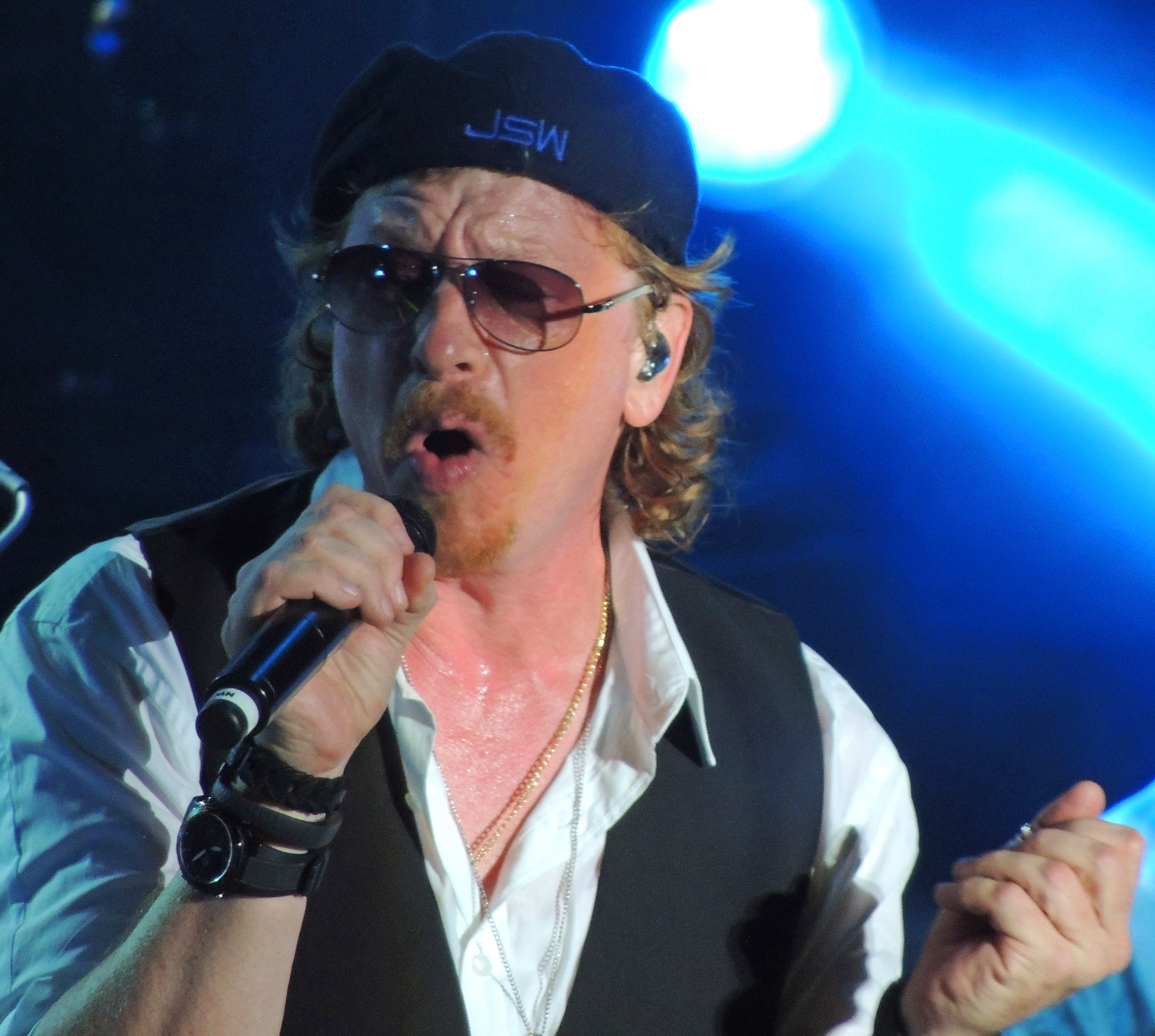
- Williams in 2013
- Born: Joseph Stanley Williams; September 1, 1960 (age 66); Santa Monica, California, U.S.
- Occupations: Singer; songwriter; composer
- Spouse: Amye Troyer (m. 1992)
- Children: 3
- Parents: John Williams (father); Barbara Ruick (mother)
- Relatives: Johnny Williams (paternal grandfather); Melville Ruick (maternal grandfather); Lurene Tuttle (maternal grandmother); Ethan Gruska (nephew); Bobby Gruska (nephew); Barbara Gruska (niece); Jay Gruska (brother-in-law)
- Musical career
- Genres: Hard rock; pop rock; film score; adult contemporary
- Instruments: Vocals; keyboards; tambourine
- Years active: 1977–present
- Member of: Toto
- Website: joeswill.com

Signature
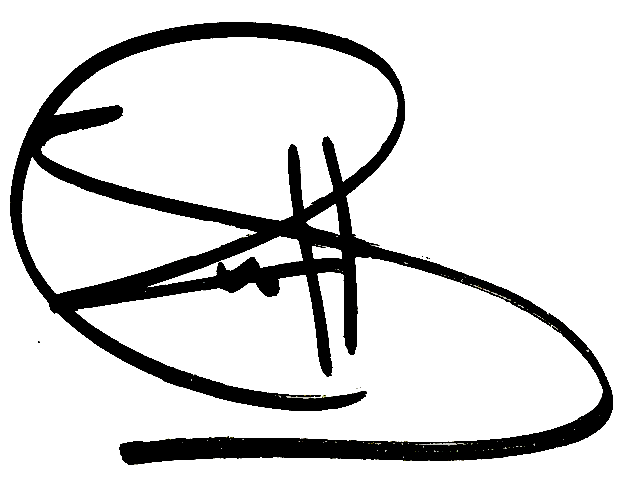

Joseph Stanley Williams (born September 1, 1960) is an American singer, songwriter and film score composer, best known as the lead vocalist of the rock band Toto from 1986 to 1988 and again since 2010. Outside of Toto, he has worked as a composer and studio vocalist, including providing the singing voice of adult Simba in the 1994 animated film The Lion King.

== Early life ==
Williams was born Joseph Stanley Williams on September 1, 1960, in Santa Monica, California, the son of actress Barbara Ruick and prolific film composer John Williams. He is the youngest of three children with an older brother and an older sister.

== Career ==
=== Toto ===
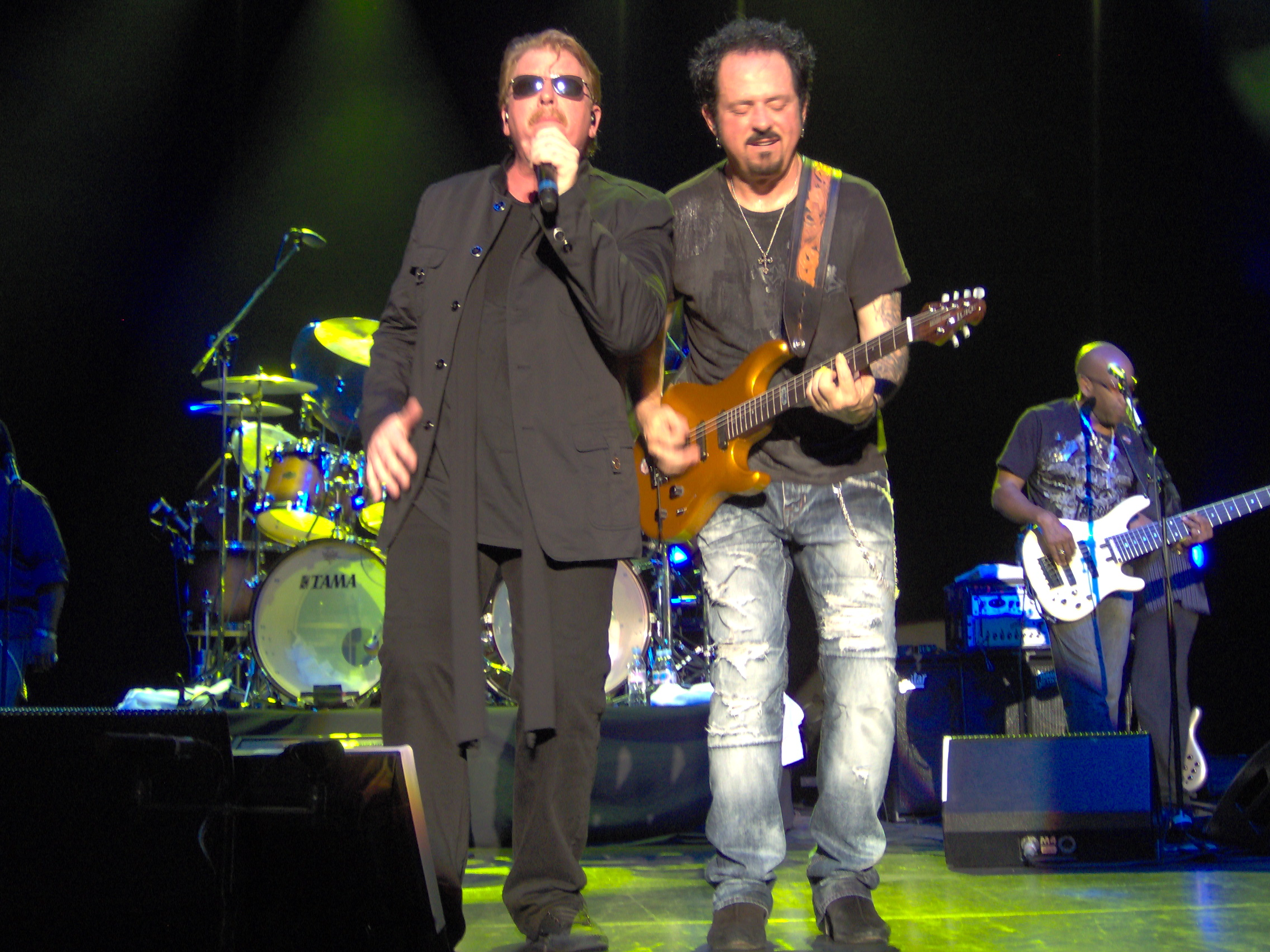
Williams (left) with Toto in Copenhagen in 2010

Williams was the lead vocalist for Toto during the mid- to late 1980s and was featured on the albums Fahrenheit (1986) and The Seventh One (1988) before leaving due to personal problems. He can also be heard on the album Toto XX (1998), a compilation of rare and unreleased tracks. He is featured on Toto's 2006 album, Falling in Between, sharing lead vocals with Steve Lukather on "Bottom of Your Soul". In addition to his guest spot on Falling in Between, Williams was a guest singer at several Toto concerts.

Williams rejoined Toto upon its reformation in 2010 and performed on the band's recent live albums and the 2015 studio album Toto XIV. When the group disbanded in 2019 and subsequently reformed in 2020, Williams was the only member from the previous lineup besides Lukather and touring members Warren Ham and Dominique "Xavier" Taplin to return.

=== Solo work as a singer ===
Williams released his first, self-titled solo album in 1982. After his initial tenure with Toto, he has released several more. Many of Toto's members have contributed to his solo work over the years. In 2003, he released an album called Vertigo, a project he initiated, but where he was not in full charge of the production, only recording and supplying the vocals. The second Vertigo album, Vertigo 2, was released in 2006. Williams released an album of cover songs from artists such as Elton John, Bryan Adams, Diane Warren, and Kevin Cronin in 2006 called Two of Us, featuring piano and voice only. He returned with two more voice and piano albums in 2007, Smiles and Tears, also consisting of classic hits by popular artists. His latest solo album containing original songs, This Fall, was released in November 2008.

=== Work as a film composer ===
Joseph Williams has also been busy as a composer of film and drama scores, most notably for episodes of the science fiction series Roswell, and The Lyon's Den starring Rob Lowe.

He was the writer of the original English lyrics for the songs "Lapti Nek" and "Ewok Celebration" from the original 1983 release of Return of the Jedi, which was scored and conducted by his father, John Williams. Both songs were replaced with new compositions in the 1997 Special Edition. He collaborated again with his father on the releases of The Phantom Menace (1999) and Attack of the Clones (2002). In the former he helped compose Augie's Great Municipal Band which appears during the ending of the film and in the latter 2M4, an untitled composition that appears during the Dex's Diner sequence.

In 2003, he was nominated for an Emmy Award for "Outstanding Main Title Theme Music" for the TV series Miracles. The music to the CBS miniseries Category 7: The End of the World and the TV film Momentum were composed by him.

=== Session work ===
Williams has been in demand as a session vocalist and can be heard on numerous projects by other artists, as well as on movie soundtracks. In 1985, Williams performed the theme song of the animated TV series Adventures of the Gummi Bears. He provided backing vocals on Peter Cetera's album World Falling Down and co-wrote the song "Man in Me", lead vocals for three tracks – "Walk the Wire", "History" and "When You Look in My Eyes" – to Jay Graydon's Airplay for the Planet album, subsequently touring with the band and backing vocals on Jon Anderson's In the City of Angels in 1988, most prominently on the song "Top of the World (The Glass Bead Game)". In Disney's animated feature film The Lion King, he can be heard as the singing voice of the Adult Simba, singing on the songs "Hakuna Matata" and "Can You Feel the Love Tonight". He reprised this singing role in the direct-to-video animated film Mickey's Magical Christmas: Snowed in at the House of Mouse. In 1997 and 1998 respectively, he shared vocal duties on two albums by the a cappella covers group The West Coast All Stars, the other vocalists being Bobby Kimball, Bill Champlin, and Jason Scheff, whereas Tommy Funderburk replaced Champlin on the Naturally album. He sings background vocals on Chicago's "King of Might Have Been" on the 2006 album Chicago XXX as well as on "Let's Take a Lifetime" on the 1993-recorded/2008-released album Chicago XXXII: Stone of Sisyphus. The song "What You're Missing" from the Chicago album Chicago 16 was co-written by him. He also sings backing vocals on five tracks from Steve Lukather's solo album Ever Changing Times in addition to lending his vocals to another three of Lukather's solo albums, All's Well That Ends Well, I Found the Sun Again and Bridges.

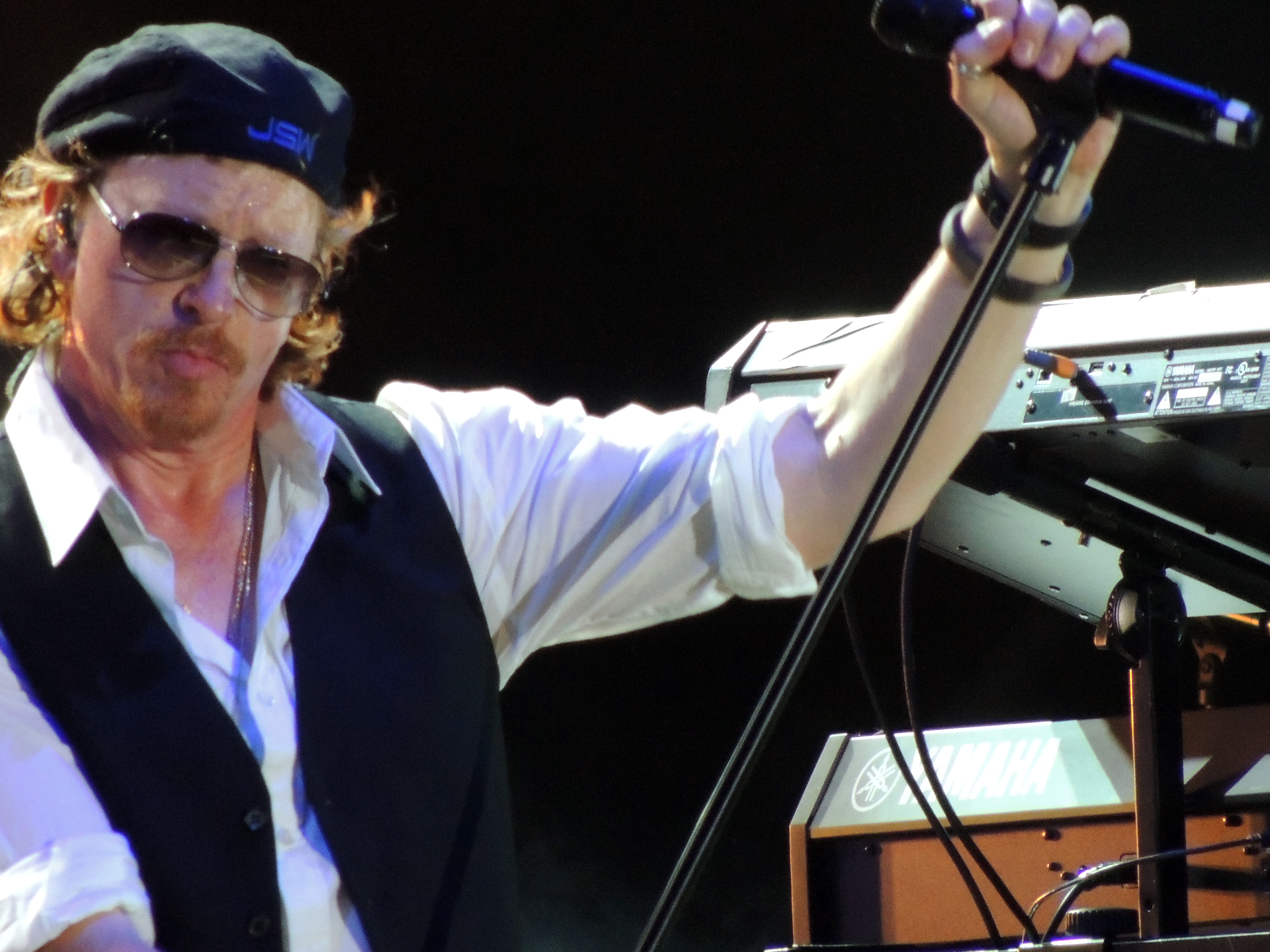
Williams in Sweden, 2013, Toto's 35th Anniversary Tour

== Discography ==
=== Toto albums ===
- 1986: Fahrenheit
- 1988: The Seventh One
- 1998: Toto XX (lead vocals on "Last Night" and “In A Word”)
- 2006: Falling in Between (co-lead vocals and background vocals on "Bottom Of Your Soul")
- 2015: Toto XIV
- 2018: Old Is New

=== Solo albums ===
- 1982: Joseph Williams
- 1996: I Am Alive
- 1997: 3
- 1999: Early Years
- 2003: Vertigo
- 2006: Two of Us
- 2006: Vertigo 2
- 2007: Smiles
- 2007: Tears
- 2008: This Fall
- 2021: Denizen Tenant

=== with Peter Friestedt ===
- 2011: Williams/Friestedt

=== with CWF - Bill Champlin / Peter Friestedt / Joseph Williams ===
- 2015: CWF
- 2018: 10 Miles
- 2020: CWF 2
- 2023: Carrie

=== Guest vocals (excerpt) ===
- 1983: Lapti Nek (Urth)
- 1984: Which One of Us Is Me (Jay Gruska)
- 1985: Save the Night (The Goonies soundtrack)
- 1985: Sleepless Nights (Alan Gorrie)
- 1985: Disney's Adventures of the Gummi Bears (Theme Song Vocals)
- 1988: In the City of Angels (Jon Anderson)
- 1989: My Heart in Red (Ijiima Mari)
- 1990: Tatsuro Songs from L.A. (compilation)
- 1990: Toy Matinee (Toy Matinee)
- 1991: Tatsuro Songs from L.A. 2 (compilation)
- 1991: Fade in Love (compilation)
- 1992: Re-Import (compilation)
- 1992: Goody's (compilation)
- 1992: The Radical Light (Vonda Shepard)
- 1993: Airplay for the Planet (Jay Graydon)
- 1993: L.A. Cowboys / Endless Summer (compilation)
- 1994: Love Stories 3 (compilation)
- 1994: The Lion King (Original Movie Soundtrack)
- 1997: California Dreamin' (West Coast All Stars)
- 1998: Naturally (West Coast All Stars)
- 1999: ELT Songs from L.A. (compilation)
- 1999: In a Dream (Lionel's Dad)
- 2001: Radioactive (Ceremony Of Innocence)
- 2002: LA Project (Peter Friestedt)
- 2006: Avalon (The Richie Zito Project)
- 2008: LA Project II (Peter Friestedt)
- 2008: Holy God (Brian Doerksen)
- 2014: My Kind O' Lovin' (Intelligent Music Project II)
- 2015: Touching the Divine' (Intelligent Music Project III)
- 2015: CWF (Champlin, Williams, Friestedt)
- 2018: 10 Miles/CWF (Champlin, Williams, Friestedt)
- 2020: CWF II (Champlin, Williams, Friestedt)
- 2023: Carrie (Champlin, Williams, Friestedt)

=== Source music (excerpt) ===
- 1983: Return of the Jedi (lyrics for "Lapti Nek" and an unused source cue)

== Filmography ==
=== Film ===
Year	Title	Role	Notes
1994	The Lion King	Adult Simba (singing voice)	Voice
2001	Mickey's Magical Christmas: Snowed in at the House of Mouse	Adult Simba	Voice; direct-to-video
2002	Disney Sing-Along Songs: Very Merry Christmas	Adult Simba	Archive footage

=== Television ===
Year	Title	Role	Notes
2000–2002	Roswell	Choir Member #1	1 episode

=== Video games ===
Year	Title	Role	Notes
1998	Lion King II: Simba's Pride: Active Play	Adult Simba (singing voice)	Voice
2010	Disney Sing It: Family Hits	Adult Simba (singing voice)	Archive footage

== Film scores ==
The following list consists of select films for which Joseph Williams composed the score and/or songs.

=== 1990s ===
Year	Title	Director	Studio(s)	Notes / Accolades
1993	The Waiter	Doug Ellin	Vance/Fellow Productions	First film score
1995	Embrace of the Vampire	Anne Goursaud	The Ministry of Film; General Media Entertainment; New Line Cinema	Known As Joseph Stanley Williams
1995	Last Gasp	Scott McGinnis	The Kushner-Locke Company; WarnerVision Films; Castel Film Romania	—N/a
1996	Poison Ivy II: Lily	Anne Goursand	New Line Cinema; Cintel Pictures; MG Entertainment	—N/a
1996	Phat Beach	Doug Ellin	Connection III Entertainment; Live Entertainment; Orion Pictures	—N/a
1996	The Legend of Gator Face	Vic Sarin	Showtime Networks; The Ministry of Film	—N/a
1996	Shoot the Moon	Tom Hodges	Sugardaddy Productions	Known as Joseph Stanley Williams
1996	Snitch	Keith Markinson	Cinestage Productions	—N/a
1997	Below Utopia	Kurt Voss	Cintel Films; Subtopian Films Inc.	—N/a
1997	Johnny Mysto: Boy Wizard	Jeff Burr	Castel Film Romania; Full Moon Entertainment; The Kushner-Locke Company	—N/a
1998	Butter	Peter Gathings Bunche	Butter Films Inc. Cintel Pictures; World International Network	—N/a
1999	From Dusk Till Dawn 2: Texas Blood Money	Scott Spiegel	Los Hooligans Productions; A Band Apart; Dimension Films	Known as Joseph Stanley Williams
1999	Judgment Day	John Terlesky	Cintel Films; Judgment Cinema Inc.	—N/a

=== 2000s ===
Year	Title	Director	Studio(s)	Notes / Accolades
2000	Chain of Command	John Terlesky	Cinetel Films; Chain of Command Inc.	Known as Joseph Stanley Williams
2001	Last Request	Tom Hodges	Kismet Productions	Known as Joseph Stanley Williams
2001	Guardian	John Terlesky	Cintel Films	Known as Joseph Stanley Williams
2002	Another Life	Tracey D'Arcy	Another Life Productions	Known as Joseph Stanley Williams
2002	Malevolent	John Terlesky	Burg/Koules Productions; Cintel Films	Known as Joseph Stanley Williams
2003	Written in Blood	John Terlesky	Cintel Films	—N/a
2004	Soccer Dog: European Cup	Sandy Tung	John Brister Productions	Known as Joseph Stanley Williams; Composed with Steve Porcaro
2005	The Golden Blaze	Bryon E. Carson	120dB Films; Aurum Digital Entertainment; DH Institute of Media Arts	Known as Joseph Stanley Williams
2006	No I in Security	Eric A. Lee	Foursquare and 7 Productions	—N/a
2007	Real Estate Super Man	Eric A. Lee	Foursquare and 7 Productions	—N/a

== Personal life ==
Williams is married to Amye Troyer. Together they have three daughters named Sarah, Hannah, and Emma.
