= Steve Lukather =

American guitarist, singer, songwriter, arranger and record producer (born 1957)

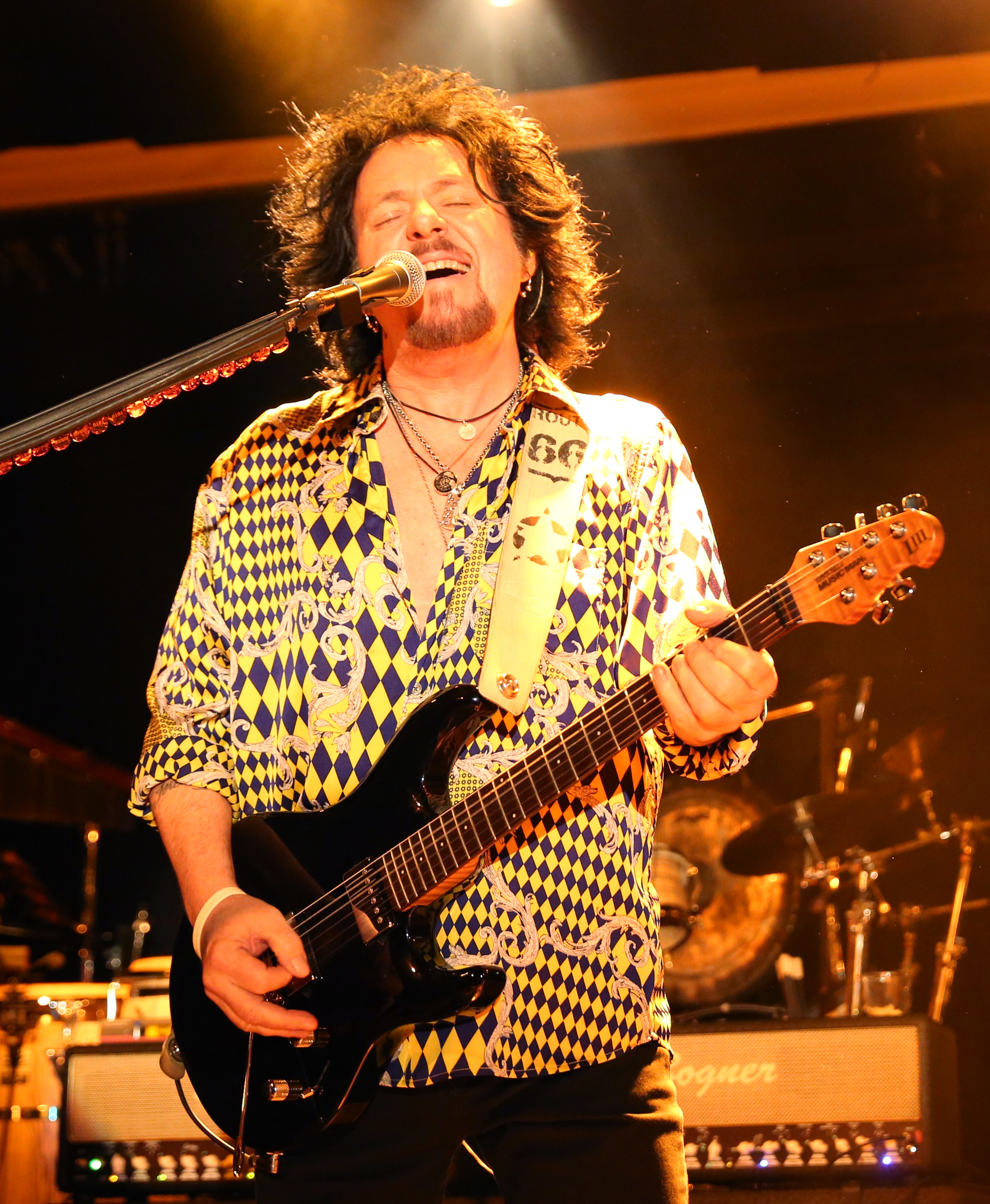
- Lukather performing in 2017
- Born: Steven Lee Lukather; October 21, 1957 (age 69); San Fernando Valley, Los Angeles, California, U.S.
- Occupations: Musician; songwriter; singer; record producer
- Years active: 1974–present
- Spouses: Marie Currie (m. 1981; div. 1990); Shawn Batten (m. 2002; div. 2010)
- Children: 4
- Relatives: Paul Lukather (uncle)
- Musical career
- Genres: Hard rock; pop rock; jazz fusion; progressive rock
- Instruments: Guitar; vocals; bass; keyboards
- Label: Mascot
- Member of: Toto; Ringo Starr & His All-Starr Band; El Grupo
- Website: stevelukather.com

Signature
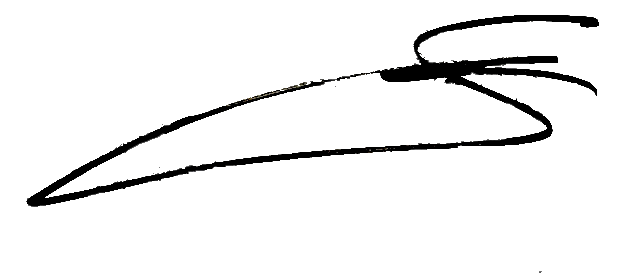
- stevelukathersignature

Steven Lee Lukather (born October 21, 1957) is an American guitarist, singer, songwriter, arranger, and record producer, best known as the sole continuous founding member of the rock band Toto. His reputation as a skilled guitarist led to a steady flow of session work beginning in the 1970s that has since established him as a prolific session musician, recording guitar tracks for more than 1,500 albums spanning a broad array of artists and genres. He has also contributed to albums and hit singles as a songwriter, arranger, and producer. Notably, Lukather played guitar on Boz Scaggs's albums Down Two Then Left (1977) and Middle Man (1980), and was a prominent contributor to Michael Jackson's Thriller (1982). Lukather has released nine solo albums, the latest of which, Bridges, was released in June 2023.

He has stated George Harrison is the reason he started playing guitar. Influenced by blues-rock guitarists such as Jimi Hendrix and Jimmy Page and jazz fusion players such as Al Di Meola and John McLaughlin, Lukather is known for a "melodic and intense" playing style. He is also recognized for his efficiency in the studio, often recording tracks in one take using minimal sound processing. While he once used many guitar effects in the studio and on stage, he now frequently disparages such practice and instead advocates cleaner tones and minimal studio processing. Lukather primarily plays a signature electric guitar manufactured by Ernie Ball Music Man bearing his nickname, Luke. He also plays Yamaha and Ovation Adamas series acoustic–electric guitars.

== Early life ==
Steven Lee Lukather was born on October 21, 1957, in the San Fernando Valley, California. His father was an assistant director and production manager at Paramount Studios and worked on shows such as The Adventures of Ozzie and Harriet and I Dream of Jeannie. Lukather first played keyboards and drums and then taught himself how to play the guitar starting at age seven, when his father bought him a copy of the Beatles album Meet the Beatles! and a Kay acoustic guitar. Lukather has said that the album "changed his life" and that he was greatly influenced by the guitar playing of George Harrison in particular.

At Grant High School, Lukather met David Paich and the Porcaro brothers (Jeff, Mike, and Steve), all of whom eventually became members of Toto. Lukather, who had been a self-taught musician, began taking guitar lessons from Jimmy Wyble. With Wyble, Lukather expanded his knowledge of wider aspects of music, including orchestration. It was during this period in the early 1970s that Lukather became interested in the idea of becoming a session musician, a vocation that provided opportunities to play with a variety of famous musicians.

Jeff Porcaro, who had been playing drums with Steely Dan since 1973, became a mentor to Lukather and nurtured his interest in session work. Lukather's first job in the music industry was studio work with Boz Scaggs, after which Paich and Jeff Porcaro—who had become prominent session musicians in their own right—asked Lukather to join them in forming Toto in 1976 along with Bobby Kimball, David Hungate, and Steve Porcaro.

== Toto ==
Lukather is the original lead guitarist for Toto, serving in that capacity for the band's entire history, as well as composer and lead and backing vocalist. Lukather won three of his five Grammy Awards for work with Toto, twice as an artist and once as a producer. David Paich led the band's songwriting efforts during the development of 1978's Toto—he penned all but two of the album's tracks, including all four of its singles. Lukather also credits Jeff Porcaro for his leadership within the band during that period. His first songwriting credit is "Hydra", which he co-wrote with the rest of the band for their second self-titled album. However, Lukather's role in Toto evolved over time owing to the changing needs of the band. In August 1992, Jeff Porcaro collapsed while doing yard work at home and subsequently died of heart failure. The death profoundly affected Toto and Lukather in particular, who felt that he needed to step up and make sure the band kept going. Thus, he began taking more of a leadership role.

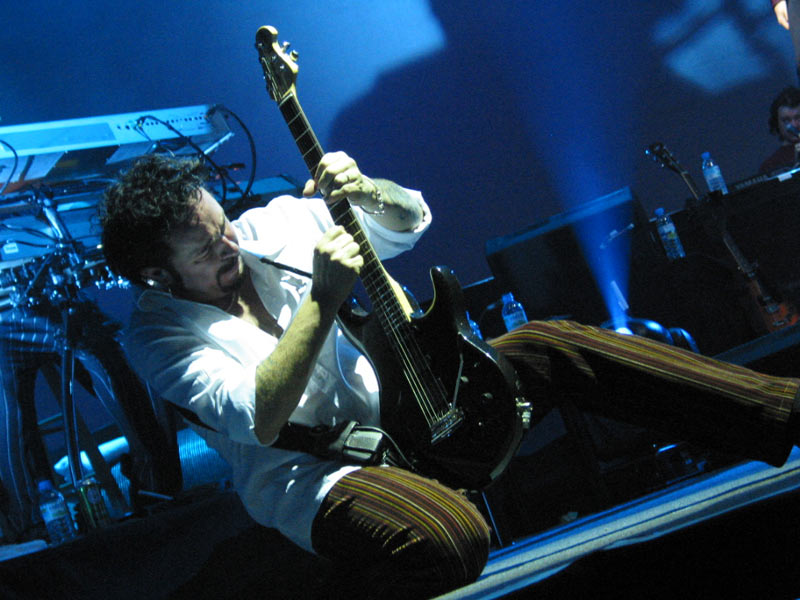
Lukather solo with Toto

Toto went through several lead vocalists over the years, including Bobby Kimball, Fergie Frederiksen, and Joseph Williams. After the 1990 dismissal of their fourth vocalist, Jean-Michel Byron, Toto was without a lead singer until around 1997; Lukather assumed most of the vocal duties for the band during that time. He performed lead vocals for every track on 1992's Kingdom of Desire and 1995's Tambu except for two instrumental tracks. The Tambu single "I Will Remember", co-written by Lukather and Stan Lynch, reached number 64 on UK charts. Some Tambu reviewers contrasted Lukather's vocals with those of former singers Kimball and Williams (and indeed, heavily criticized the entire album), some concert reviewers noted that he struggled vocally on certain songs, and a number of backup singers and guest vocalists accompanied the band's live shows during that period. It was not until Toto brought back Williams and Kimball to collaborate on 1998's Toto XX that Lukather returned primarily to the role of backup vocalist.

Lukather's songwriting contributions grew from a few tracks on early Toto albums to co-writing almost every track starting in the late 1980s. Lukather admitted that the reason why he has no songwriting contributions on the first two Toto albums was that he was not writing many songs at the time, being intimidated by the talent of the band's chief songwriter, David Paich. He credits Paich with encouraging him to contribute more songs to the band. He wrote very few of Toto's songs by himself, an exception being the hit single "I Won't Hold You Back" from Toto IV. Lukather has said that writing lyrics is not one of his strengths. Thus, he collaborated with other band members to complete song ideas and make them into viable album tracks. Lukather's official site claims he contributed to writing all the songs on Toto's 2006 album Falling in Between, even though "Spiritual Man" officially credits Paich as the sole writer.

By 2008, Lukather was the only original Toto member still performing with the band: Bobby Kimball was also in the band at the time but had been absent from it for a while, whereas Lukather has been with Toto since its formation. However, in June of the same year, Lukather decided to leave Toto. This decision directly led to the official dissolution of the band. In a 2011 interview discussing his career with Toto, Lukather indicated that the band had evolved too far from its original incarnation and that he was dealing with the physical and mental toll of recording and performing. In February 2010, the band announced that they would reunite to support Toto bassist Mike Porcaro, who was diagnosed with Lou Gehrig's disease. They continued to tour on a limited basis in 2011 and 2012.

Although Lukather indicated in April 2011 that the band would not record any further material, Toto announced an international tour schedule and new studio album in March 2014. In March 2015, Toto XIV was released. The band toured in celebration of its 40th anniversary from 2016 to 2019, when Lukather announced an indefinite hiatus. A new Toto lineup converged in 2020 to resume performances, featuring Lukather and Williams as the only members persisting from previous lineups, though Paich would still make guest appearances and is considered an official member. The group has virtual livestream performances and eventual live concerts planned for 2020 and 2021, with John Pierce on bass guitar, Robert "Sput" Searight on drums, Steve Maggiora on keyboards, Dominique "Xavier" Taplin on keyboards, and Warren Ham providing additional vocals.

On January 10, 2024, the band announced "The Dogz of Oz" lineup and officially welcomed back Greg Phillinganes (keyboards) and Shannon Forrest (drums), along with a touring schedule extending into 2025.

== Session work ==
Lukather achieved notability in the 1970s and 1980s as one of the most sought-after session guitarists in Los Angeles, playing with a wide range of artists from Aretha Franklin to Warren Zevon. He has performed on over 1,500 records spanning 36 years. Music journalist Jude Gold noted, "It's hard to name a guitarist who has had a more prolific and fulfilling career than Steve Lukather." Lukather credits fellow Toto members David Paich and Jeff Porcaro for getting him exposure in the industry. He lamented in an April 2011 interview that opportunities for session musicians have diminished in recent years: "There is no 'session guy' thing any more—not like it was. It's not like the old days when I was doing 25 sessions a week. All the studios are gone. The budgets are gone. The record companies are all gone." His own output as a session musician has slowed along with the rest of the industry; in 2009, Lukather stated he was doing only a few sessions a year.

Named by Gibson Guitar Corporation as one of the Top 10 session guitarists of all time, Lukather has performed on many notable tracks, including Olivia Newton-John's Physical album, Earth, Wind & Fire's Faces album, soloing on the tracks "Back on the Road" and "You Went Away", two tracks from the Lionel Richie album Can't Slow Down, and "Nothin' You Can Do About It" from the Richard Marx album Repeat Offender, as well as "Stand Back" by Stevie Nicks from her album, The Wild Heart. Lukather and Jeff Porcaro were heavily involved in the recording of virtually all of Michael Jackson's Thriller. Mark Ronson has said, "I've done way more time Googling Lukather's tone on 'Beat It' than ... Eddie Van Halen's because it's the tone that drives the whole record—that's the riff." In addition to recording guitar tracks, Lukather has also written or produced music for Lionel Richie, Richard Marx, Chicago, Donna Summer, and The Tubes. He won a Grammy Award in 1982 for the George Benson song "Turn Your Love Around" (co-written with Jay Graydon and Bill Champlin).

== Solo albums ==
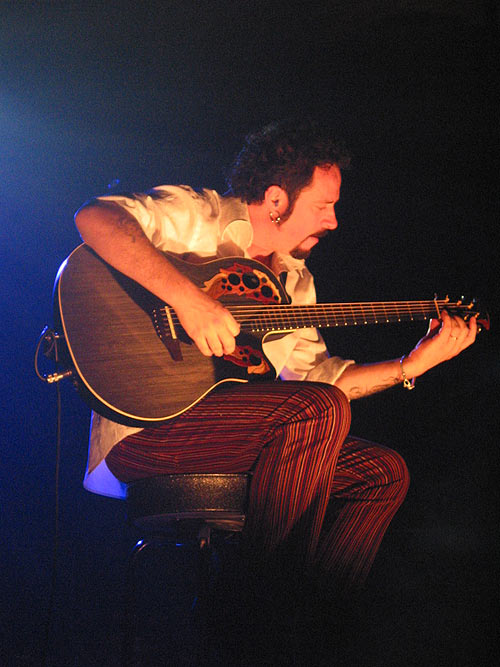
Lukather performing as vocalist and guitarist in Osnabrück, Germany, 2004

Lukather has released nine solo studio albums: Lukather (1989), Candyman (1994), Luke (1997), Santamental (2003), Ever Changing Times (2008), All's Well That Ends Well (2010), Transition (2013), I Found the Sun Again (2021), and Bridges (2023).

=== 1989–1997: Lukather, Candyman, and Luke ===
The 1989 album Lukather came about after Toto had been recording and playing for 11 years, and the consensus among the band members was to take a break. As Lukather had written a number of songs that did not appear on Toto albums, he decided to pursue a solo album, with the intention of presenting a dimension of his music that fans would be unfamiliar with. He collaborated with many notable musicians, including Eddie Van Halen, Richard Marx, Jan Hammer, Steve Stevens, and fellow Toto members Jeff Porcaro and David Paich. Lukather has said that the album was produced very simply and that a lot of ambient studio noise—counting off on various tracks, for instance—is audible on it. He also credits bands Pink Floyd, Cream, and Led Zeppelin and guitarists Jimi Hendrix, David Gilmour, Jeff Beck, and Eric Clapton as influences on the album. The single "Swear Your Love" came from the album.

Candyman, recorded and mastered from March 1993 through November 1993, was a collaboration of musicians who were for the most part also in Lukather's band Los Lobotomys. Toto familiars Simon Phillips and David Paich participated as well as David Garfield, John Peña, Chris Trujillo, Lenny Castro, Larry Klimas, Fee Waybill, Richard Page, and Paul Rodgers. Lukather recorded the album in mostly live takes with little overdubbing. Some international fans were confused about whether Candyman was a Steve Lukather album or a Los Lobotomys album. The Japanese and US releases of Candyman were under the Los Lobotomys name rather than Lukather's; the Japanese release also featured a version of the Hendrix song "Red House". The European release of Candyman was credited to Lukather alone. Additionally, the touring band for the album was sometimes introduced as "Steve Lukather and Los Lobotomys" and sometimes as just "Los Lobotomys". The song "Borrowed Time" was released as a single in Europe and included "Red House" as a B-side.

Lukather describes 1997's Luke as a much different and more "introspective" album than his previous two solo efforts. The album is a concentrated collection of many of Lukather's musical influences, and he deliberately let those influences come out on the album. Luke is an experimental album, and like Candyman, it was recorded mostly in live sessions with minimal overdubbing and processing afterwards. Luke also features instrumentation not heard on previous Lukather albums: pedal steel, harmonicas, Mellotrons, and experimental guitar, bass, and drum sounds. The US version of Luke includes a version of the Jeff Beck song "The Pump". The song "Hate Everything About U" was released as a single.

=== 2003: Santamental ===
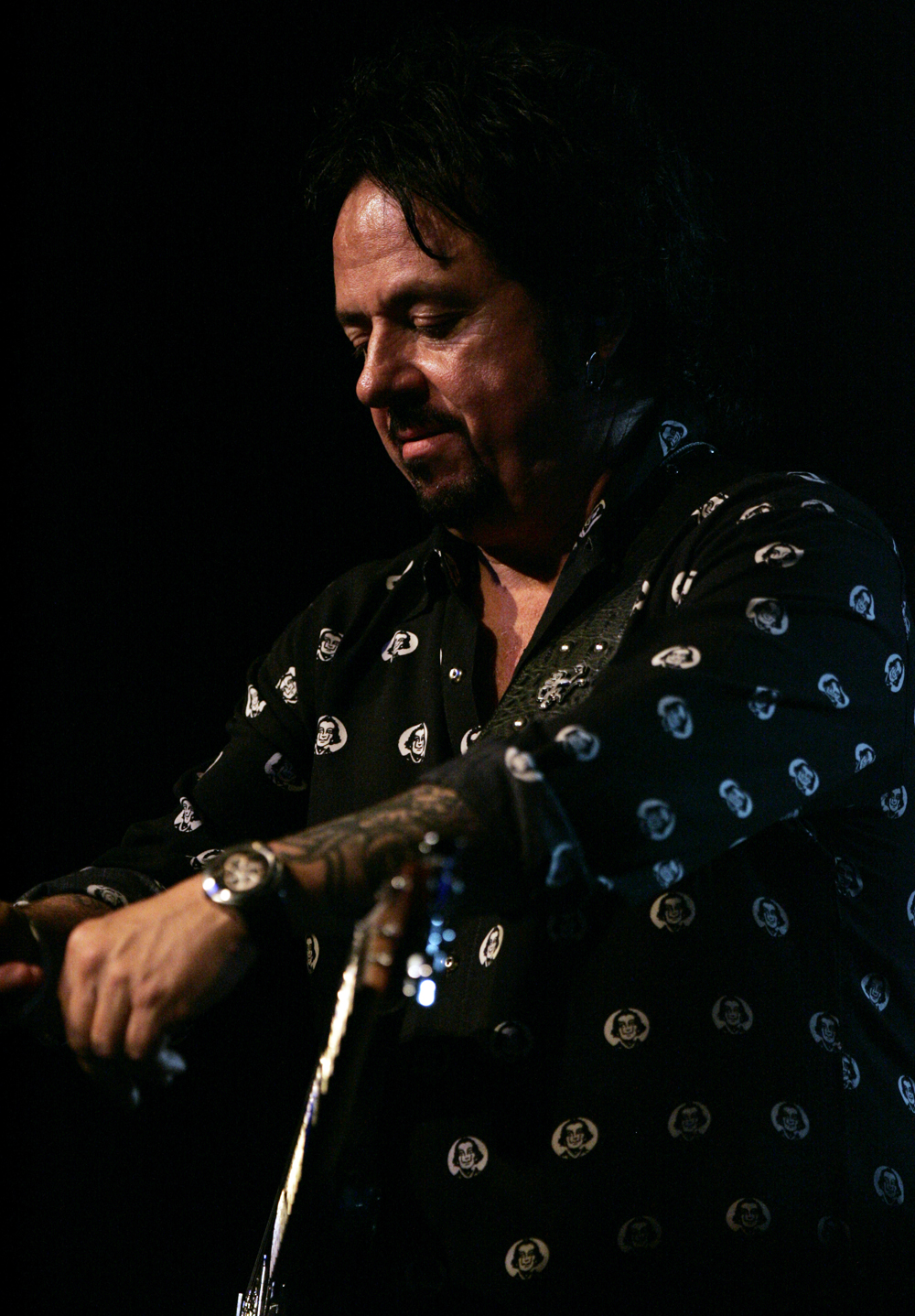
Lukather performing with Ringo Starr, 2016

Santamental, released in October 2003, is a collaborative project featuring several prominent musicians, such as guitarists Eddie Van Halen, Slash, and Steve Vai and drummer Gregg Bissonette. When Lukather's record company, Bop City Records, approached him about recording a Christmas album, he responded with a quip about his suitability for the project. The company wanted him to do the record, knowing he would approach the project with a unique angle and produce something different from the typical Christmas album. Lukather recruited keyboardist Jeff Babko and guitarist Larry Carlton, who Lukather had worked with previously, to help arrange the songs. The project was a challenge to Lukather, who had to be creative to turn the traditionally simple songs into something interesting for listeners without altering the fundamental structures. He said of the album, "But I never dreamt in a million years that I'd do a Christmas record."

The musicians Lukather chose for Santamental, most of whom were involved in the hard-rock genre, lent a heavy feel to the album. Van Halen recorded guitar tracks for "Joy to the World" after not having been in the studio for some time but immediately made an impression on Lukather with his level of playing. Vai provided guitar work for "Carol of the Bells" along with Lukather's son Trevor, then 14 years old. Slash, who recorded his part in one take, played on the Lukather/Stan Lynch composition "Broken Heart for Christmas". Lukather spoke highly of Slash after the project, calling him the "Keith Richards of our generation". Well-known session guitarist Michael Landau played on the song "Look Out For Angels", and there is a version of "Jingle Bells" featuring a big band and sung by Sammy Davis Jr. Santamental was recorded in six days, after which Lukather proclaimed it "his first and last Christmas album".

=== 2008–2013: Ever Changing Times, All's Well That Ends Well, and Transition ===
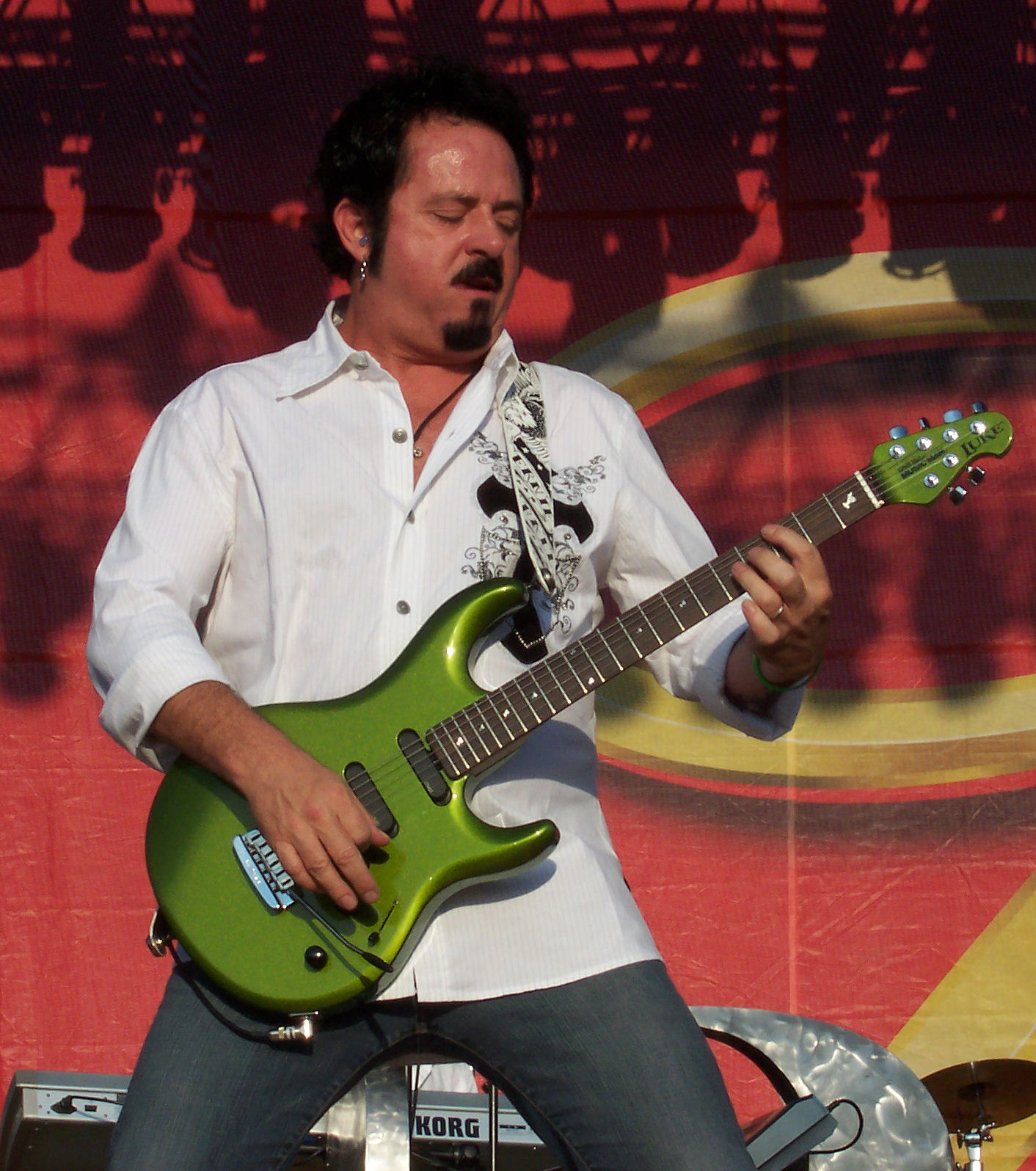
Lukather performing with Toto, 2007

Ever Changing Times, released on February 22, 2008, is a collection of songs Lukather recorded in 2007 between Toto tours. The album contains contributions from fellow session musicians Bill Champlin, Abe Laboriel, Jr., Leland Sklar, Steve Porcaro, and many others. Lukather's son Trevor contributed as well. Joseph Williams provides backing vocals on five of the tracks. Lukather wrote the songs for the album in a hotel room with his son and a handful of other musicians, using basic equipment. His songwriting philosophy is that if a song sounds good with only guitars and vocals, it will likely sound good after a full production. Lukather collaborated with Grammy Award-winning engineer and producer Steve MacMillan on the project, with the goal of introducing some new methods and techniques into the recording process. Lukather described the final tracks as "perfectly imperfect", preferring to record with the five-piece backing band in one room and in one take. MacMillan encouraged Lukather to use "organic, vintage tones". As a result, Lukather eschewed effects and played the guitar parts directly through tube amplifiers manufactured by Marshall, Vox, and some boutique brands. Lukather commented that MacMillan served as a valuable "second set of ears" in the studio, often encouraging him to keep parts he normally would have discarded. As Toto had recently disbanded when Ever Changing Times was released, Lukather embarked on a solo tour to promote the album. The shows featured a mixture of songs from the album, songs written for other side projects, and "a few Toto obscurities".

Lukather's sixth studio album, All's Well That Ends Well, was released on October 11, 2010, in Europe and Japan, and on November 16 as a digital download worldwide. The material was written predominantly in collaboration with longtime associate C. J. Vanston, and the album features stalwart musicians from Lukather's touring band. Songwriter Randy Goodrum, who has collaborated with Lukather many times over the years, including on the 1986 Toto single "I'll Be over You", contributes to the track "Brody's". All's Well That Ends Well draws from Lukather's personal experiences in the two years since Ever Changing Times. Critic Arlene Weiss noted that the album features three distinct flavors of music: one that "bares [Lukather's] soul and emotional heartache", one that pans elements of popular culture like TMZ.com, and one that expresses optimism and enthusiasm about the future. While Lukather focused on instrumental writing and production on previous albums but collaborated with lyricists, he wrote much of the lyrics for All's Well That Ends Well himself. Lukather describes the album as being a "real" and "honest" reflection of the period between 2008 and 2010, when he experienced difficulties within his private life.

In December 2011, Lukather announced the beginning of work on Transition. The album was produced with songwriter and record producer C.J. Vanston and involved musicians Chad Smith, Gregg Bissonette, Leland Sklar, Steve Weingart, and others. Throughout 2012, Lukather released notes and news of the album development through his website. The title was announced on October 12, 2012. The album was released on January 21, 2013.

=== 2020–present: I Found the Sun Again and Bridges ===
After seven years without the release of any solo material, Lukather released a single entitled "Run to Me" on August 19, 2020. Two months later, he announced that he would release solo albums simultaneously with longtime Toto collaborator Joseph Williams. Lukather's and Williams's albums, on which they mutually contributed, are entitled I Found the Sun Again and Denizen Tenant, respectively, and were released on February 26, 2021. Lukather's latest album is titled Bridges and was released on June 16, 2023. It is preceded by the first single, "When I See You Again". On Instagram, he said, "My ninth solo album, Bridges, could not be more accurately titled. I see it as a bridge between my solo music and Toto music. This is as close as we will get to a new Toto record."

== Side projects ==
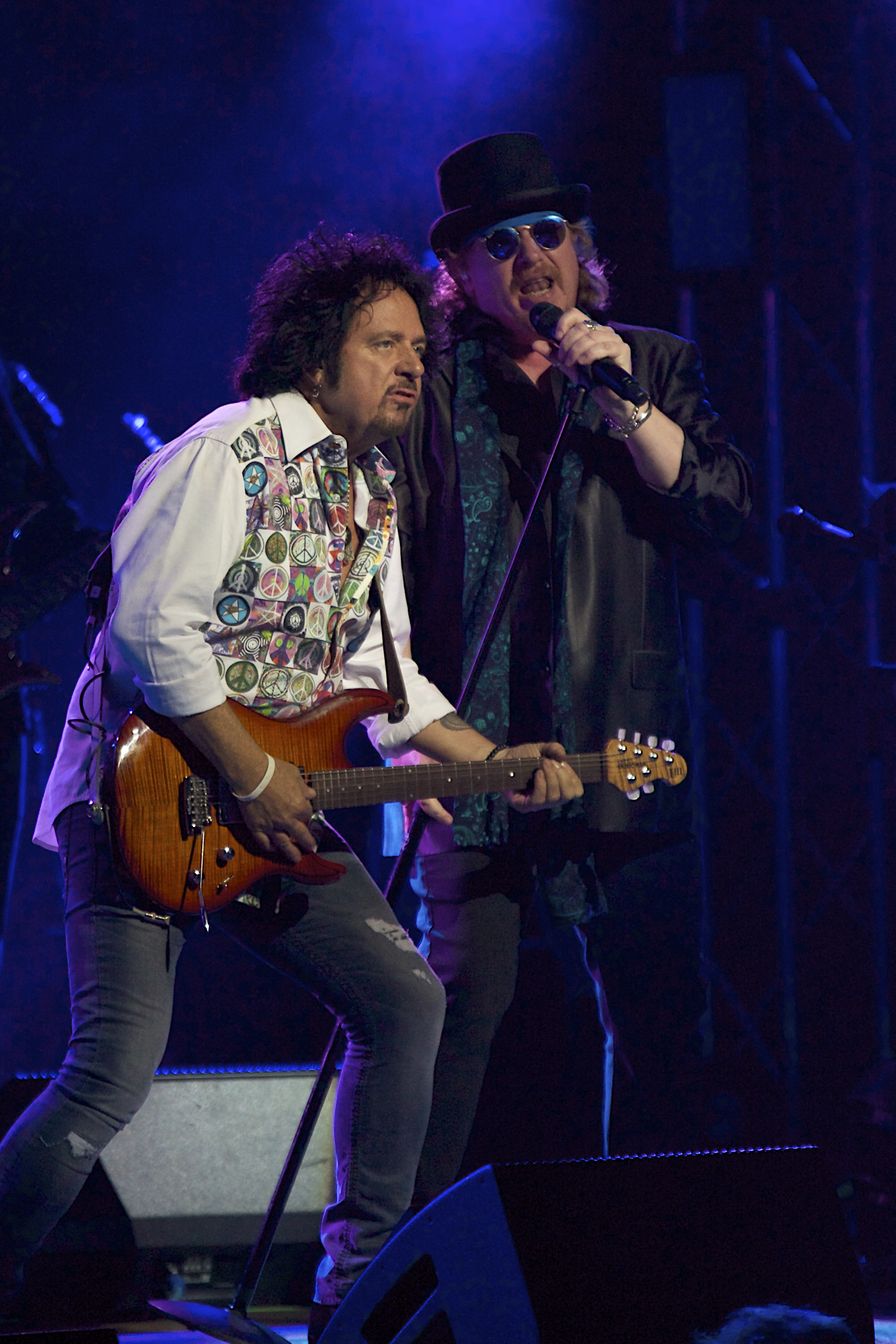
Lukather and Joseph Williams performing with Toto, 2016

When not working with Toto, Lukather has participated in numerous side projects, including playing with jazz fusion band Los Lobotomys and with other session musicians, and touring with Larry Carlton, Joe Satriani, Steve Vai, and others.

Lukather was a long-time member of the band Los Lobotomys, a collaboration of session musicians including jazz and bebop player David "Creatchy" Garfield and Toto drummer Jeff Porcaro, replaced after his death by Simon Phillips, who also replaced Porcaro in Toto. Los Lobotomys formed in the mid-1980s and played regular shows in the Los Angeles area, often inviting whatever session musicians happened to be available and in the area. In 1989, they recorded the album Los Lobotomys which was released in Japan. The band was also heavily involved in the recording of Lukather's Candyman. In 2004, Los Lobotomys released a live album titled The Official Bootleg which included live tracks from 1994 and 1999.

In 1998, Lukather received an invitation to tour Japan with fellow guitarist Larry Carlton after Japanese promoters requested that Carlton's annual tours each be different from the last. Lukather and Carlton exchanged some recorded material and decided that a collaboration would be interesting. Lukather was flattered by the invitation to tour with Carlton, citing him as his favorite guitarist. Lukather speaks highly of their stage efforts, although the two were admittedly outside their normal realm of work. He stated in an interview that "you can hear us having fun on the record—you can hear the smiles on our faces". After several shows, the duo realized that they should record their collaboration even if just for their own use. Guitarist and producer Steve Vai heard one of the subsequent recordings and expressed interest in releasing it under his Favored Nations label, also home to such artists as Eric Johnson and Dweezil Zappa. Vai and Lukather mixed and produced the recording, which is said to be a mixture of jazz, blues, and fusion music. The resulting album, No Substitutions: Live in Osaka, won a 2001 Grammy Award for Best Pop Instrumental Album. Album reviewers described Lukather as having a heavier style than Carlton. Lukather and Carlton later did an international tour in support of the album.

In 2005, Lukather won critical praise for his rendition of the Jimi Hendrix song "Little Wing" at a gala 90th birthday celebration for jazz guitarist Les Paul. Returning after a five-year absence, the 2012 G3 Tour featured Lukather alongside Joe Satriani and Steve Vai.

In the autumn of 2006, Lukather contributed his cover version of the Michael Landau song "I'm Buzzed" (originally from Landau's Tales From The Bulge album) from a live recording of his side band project, El Grupo, to the album project Artists for Charity – Guitarists 4 the Kids, produced by Slang Productions, to assist World Vision Canada in helping underprivileged kids in need.

In February 2012, Ringo Starr announced that Lukather would be the guitarist in his All Starr Band for their summer tour. Lukather has been touring with that ensemble since that time, performing three Toto songs ("Hold the Line", "Rosanna", and "Africa") nightly.

Lukather contributes material and expertise to instructional and educational enterprises. In 1985, he released the instructional "Star Licks" guitar video featuring many of the guitar parts from the first five Toto studio albums. It was released on DVD in 2005. The guitarist has also been participating in the Fermatta Master Class Series project, an educational cooperative organized by the Fermatta Music Academy in Mexico.

Lukather has periodically performed with a side band named Nerve Bundle at The Baked Potato in Studio City, California, around Christmas time. The band features Toss Panos on drums, Jeff Babko on keyboards, and Jorgen Carlsson on bass.

In 2024, Lukather contributed guitar to a re-release of Mark Knopfler's "Going Home: Theme of the Local Hero" in aid of the Teenage Cancer Trust.

== Musical style and equipment ==
Influenced by such blues-rock guitarists as Eric Clapton, Jeff Beck, Jimi Hendrix, and Jimmy Page, and such jazz fusion players as John McLaughlin and Al Di Meola, Lukather is known for a "melodic and intense" playing style. He has also cited Steely Dan as a major long-time influence—one that emerges prominently in later solo work such as All's Well That Ends Well. Journalist Jude Gold notes that his vibrato is very pronounced and his "exaggerated wide bends" are distinctive and quickly recognizable. Well-versed in music theory, Lukather can follow chord charts and changes in a way typical of jazz musicians—this ability enhances his value as a session musician. In interviews, he has explained how he thinks of the guitar in a "chordal cluster" format and not the typical "linear scale" format.

Lukather's approach to engineering his sound in the studio is usually simple. He is not known for doing a large number of takes or for incorporating much overdubbing—rather, he has a reputation for doing only single takes for many parts. He has said about this approach: "If a solo didn't work—either because I didn't have the right sound, or because I wasn't inspired at that moment—I'd just move on. A part either works or it doesn't. You can't batter it into submission, or force inspiration to save you. It's always better to just surrender, and then come back later to give it a go with fresh ears." Although he enjoys the technical mastery that is possible in the studio, Lukather prefers the dynamic of performing live on stage. He has stated that dynamics are the most important element of producing a recording with good sound quality.

Despite being known in the past for having an intricate set of effects units, Lukather now says he plays mostly free of such modifications after seeing some overdone commercial unit configurations named after him. Other than some delay, he has not used many effects in recent years. He has held a long association with Bob Bradshaw of Custom Audio Electronics, who designed and manufactured key elements of Lukather's effects rack. Lukather was one of the few official endorsers of EMG pickups, having collaborated on his own Lukather signature "SL20" pickup system, which is in essence a "loaded pickguard" system incorporating two single-coil EMG SLV pickups and an EMG 85 humbucker. The system also has single master volume and tone knobs. In December 2012, Lukather collaborated with DiMarzio pickups on a new set of signature pickups called "Transition". He has been using these pickups in his Music Man Luke 3 guitar.

Lukather endorses Music Man guitars and has a signature model named "Luke" that incorporates his signature EMG pickup system. The guitar started out with only Music Man specifications (including a Floyd Rose locking vibrato, later replaced with a vintage-style fulcrum bridge), but in 1998, the manufacturer made several customizations to the model to better fit Lukather's playing style. Music Man also produces a Ball Family Reserve Steve Lukather Model that features an alder body with a mahogany "tone block" inlaid under the pickups, capped with a figured maple top and transparent finish. In 2012, a new version of the guitar called the LIII was introduced with a 3% larger but similarly contoured body, an all-rosewood neck, and passive pickup options (dual humbucker or single-single-humbucker) combined with an active preamp and a 12-dB boost activated from a push/push tone pot. The LIII model also debuted Lukather's switch from EMG to custom DiMarzio "Transition" model pickups. In 2013, Lukather changed to a roasted maple neck with a rosewood fret board, citing the exceptional stability of roasted maple while touring as a factor in his decision. As a result, the LIII specification and production were changed to match Lukather's preference. Lukather has also been known to play Ibanez and Valley Arts guitars. His relationship with Ibanez and Valley Arts yielded an endorsement for a brief time in the 1980s with the release of the Ibanez Roadstar RS1010SL and Valley Arts Custom Pro Steve Lukather Signature guitars in 1984–85. He has played Ovation Adamas series acoustic–electric guitars. Starting before his 2010 All's Well That Ends Well tour, Lukather began playing and endorsing Yamaha Studio Response Technology acoustic–electric guitars.

Information about his current equipment can be found on Lukather's website.

== Personal life ==
Lukather dated singer Marie Currie in the late 70s, and they got married on November 7, 1981. They had two children, Tina (born May 13, 1985) and Trevor (born May 4, 1987). They divorced in 1990. In 1980, he collaborated with her and her twin sister on an album titled Messin' with the Boys.

Lukather married Shawn Batten in 2002, whom he had been dating since the late 1990s. They had two children, Lily Rose (born September 7, 2007) and Bodhi William (born December 12, 2010). They divorced in 2010.

Steve has stated in a Roundtable with Drew interview that he is single as of 2022.

== Discography ==
=== Studio albums ===
- Lukather (1989)
- Candyman (1994)
- Luke (1997)
- Santamental (2003)
- Ever Changing Times (2008)
- All's Well That Ends Well (2010)
- Transition (2013)
- I Found the Sun Again (2021)
- Bridges (2023)

=== Collaborative albums ===
- Lotus Gem (with Carlos Santana and Jeff Beck) (1992)
- No Substitutions: Live in Osaka (with Larry Carlton) (2001)
- An Odd Couple Live (with Edgar Winter) (2010)

=== With Toto ===
- Toto (1978)
- Hydra (1979)
- Turn Back (1981)
- Toto IV (1982)
- Isolation (1984)
- Fahrenheit (1986)
- The Seventh One (1988)
- Kingdom of Desire (1992)
- Tambu (1995)
- Toto XX (1998)
- Mindfields (1999)
- Through the Looking Glass (2002)
- Falling in Between (2006)
- Toto XIV (2015)
- Old Is New (2018)

=== With Peter Criss ===
- Peter Criss (1978)
- Out of Control (1980)
- Let Me Rock You (1982)

=== With Los Lobotomys ===
- Los Lobotomys (1989)

=== With El Grupo ===
- El Grupo Live (2005)

== Awards ==
- 1982 – Grammy Award for Best R&B Song: Steve Lukather, Jay Graydon, Bill Champlin (for George Benson) – "Turn Your Love Around"
- 1982 – Grammy Award for Producer of the Year: Toto – Toto IV
- 1982 – Grammy Award for Album of the Year: Toto – Toto IV
- 1982 – Grammy Award for Record of the Year: Toto – "Rosanna"
- 2002 – Grammy Award for Best Pop Instrumental Album: Larry Carlton & Steve Lukather – No Substitutions: Live in Osaka
- 2009 – Musicians Hall Of Fame
- 2010 – Eddy Christiani Award
- 2015 – Guitar Player Magazine – Lifetime Achievement Award

== Books ==
- The Gospel According to Luke (2018) Post Hill Press.
