= Lenny Castro =

American percussionist (born 1956)

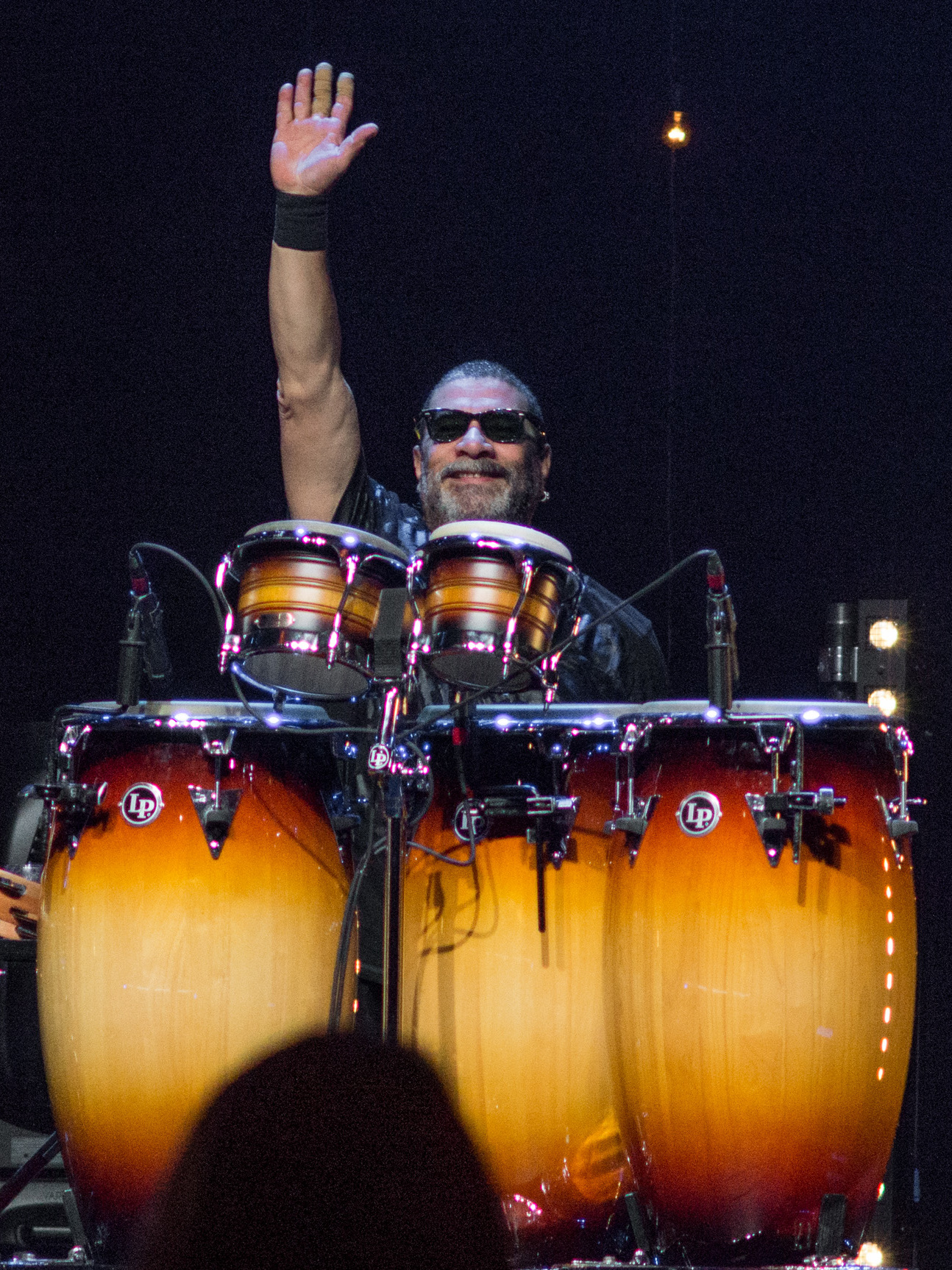
- Castro performing with Joe Bonamassa in 2015

Background information
- Born: Leonard Castro; September 19, 1956 (age 70); New York City, New York, U.S.
- Occupations: Session musician; songwriter; composer
- Instrument: Percussion
- Years active: 1975–present
- Spouse: Paulette Brown (m. 1982; died 1998)

Lenny Castro (born September 19, 1956) is an American percussionist. He is one of the most prolific percussionists of all time, appearing on hundreds of albums, including those by the Red Hot Chili Peppers, Adele, Maroon 5, U2, Earth, Wind & Fire, Toto, The Rolling Stones, Dolly Parton, Stevie Nicks, Michael McDonald, Joe Sample, and Eric Clapton, the latter of whom he played with on the Grammy-winning song "Tears in Heaven".

== Early life ==
Castro was born and raised in New York City to parents of Puerto Rican descent. His father, Hector Castro, was a keyboardist and musical director for Latin artists such as Johnny Pacheco. His parents separated when he was young, and his stepfather introduced him to percussion instruments by gifting him his first pair of congas at a young age.

Castro attended Fiorello H. LaGuardia High School of Music & Art, where he studied classical percussion. Castro also studied in several music schools and ensembles such as Mannes School Of Music and Third Street Music School.

== Career ==
After graduating high school and playing in local bands around New York City, he was discovered by singer Melissa Manchester at age 19 and went on tour as her percussionist. Castro later moved to Los Angeles with Manchester where he was introduced to producer Richard Perry. Perry then hired him to play on Diana Ross' album Baby It's Me, where Castro first met session drummer Jeff Porcaro. Castro then joined Porcaro in Boz Scaggs' backing band on his 1977 summer tour, where he performed alongside other future Toto members Steve Lukather and Steve Porcaro. He also met his future wife, Paulette Brown, who was a backing vocalist on the tour. Castro toured with Scaggs again in 1980.

=== Toto ===
In 1978, Castro was invited to join Toto for their debut album and tour, performing with them on all tours from 1982 to 1988 and on all subsequent studio albums. Among his notable contributions to the band is the ethnic percussion on their hit single "Africa", where he and Jeff Porcaro created the percussion loop. In July 1988, Castro filled in for percussionist Luis Conte on their The Seventh One World Tour. In 2015, Castro rejoined Toto, touring with them until 2019.

From 1986 to 1993, Castro also performed with the Toto side project Los Lobotomys. The band regularly performed at The Baked Potato jazz club in Studio City and released a self-titled album in 1989. They also backed Steve Lukather on his 1994 album Candyman.

=== Other work ===
In 1980, Castro joined Neil Larsen and Buzz Feiten's band in the studio and on their subsequent tours. They released the albums Larsen-Feiten Band and Full Moon.

In 1986, Castro toured with Christopher Cross. He had previously performed on Cross' eponymous debut album and Another Page. From 1997 to 1998, Castro performed with Fleetwood Mac on their reunion tour and accompanying live album The Dance.

In 2004, Castro was nominated for Best Contemporary Jazz Album at the 46th Annual Grammys for the album Rural Renewal as part of The Crusaders.

In 2018, he released his debut solo album, Hands of Silk and Stone, which included contributions from Toto members David Paich and Steve Lukather.

Since 2022, Castro has recorded and toured with John Mayer. He first performed with Mayer on his 2003 album Heavier Things. He then rejoined Mayer for his 2021 album Sob Rock.

== Personal life ==
In July 1982, Castro married session vocalist, Paulette Brown. They had two children together. Brown died in 1998.
