= Toto discography =

Cataloging of published recordings by the band Toto

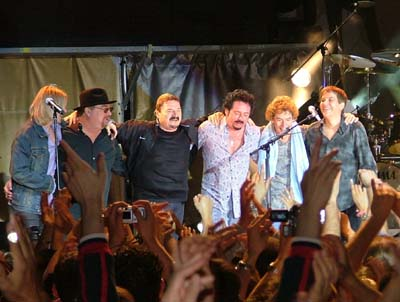
- Toto in 2004
- Studio albums: 14
- Soundtrack albums: 1
- Live albums: 7
- Compilation albums: 19
- Singles: 65
- Music videos: 31

This article presents the discography of American rock band Toto.

== Albums ==
=== Studio albums ===
Title	Album details	Peak chart positions											Certification (sales threshold)
Title	Album details	US	CAN	AUS	UK	JPN	FIN	SWE	NOR	NZ	GER	NL	Certification (sales threshold)
Toto	Release date: October 10, 1978; Label: Columbia	9	9	2	37	39	1	5	12	24	8	25	RIAA: 2× Platinum; ARIA: Platinum; BVMI: Gold; MC: 2× Platinum
Hydra	Release date: October 26, 1979; Label: Columbia	37	10	41	—	28	23	15	1	29	38	—	RIAA: Gold; MC: Platinum
Turn Back	Release date: January 16, 1981; Label: Columbia	41	29	89	—	3	21	16	4	—	39	—	RIAJ: Gold
Toto IV	Release date: April 1, 1982; Label: Columbia	4	1	1	4	3	12	17	2	9	12	1	RIAA: 4× Platinum; ARIA: 2× Platinum; BPI: Gold; BVMI: Platinum; IFPI FIN: Gold; MC: 3× Platinum; NVPI: Platinum; RIAJ: Platinum
Isolation	Release date: October 18, 1984; Label: Columbia	42	57	65	67	2	17	8	8	—	15	25	RIAA: Gold
Fahrenheit	Release date: August 20, 1986; Label: Columbia	40	44	98	99	3	7	6	12	—	24	19	RIAA: Gold
The Seventh One	Release date: February 8, 1988; Label: Columbia	64	54	77	73	3	3	2	4	—	10	1	GLF: Platinum; NVPI: Platinum; RIAJ: Gold
Kingdom of Desire	Release date: September 7, 1992; Label: Columbia	—	—	—	—	8	4	3	7	—	18	5	GLF: Gold
Tambu	Release date: September 29, 1995; Label: Columbia	—	—	—	—	24	6	5	6	—	36	9	
Mindfields	Release date: February 1999; Label: Columbia	—	—	—	—	19	5	7	7	—	—	23	
Through the Looking Glass	Release date: October 21, 2002; Label: Capitol	—	—	—	—	53	39	26	—	—	22	40	
Falling in Between	Release date: February 14, 2006; Label: Frontiers	—	—	—	—	22	12	6	16	—	13	10	
Toto XIV	Release date: March 20, 2015; Label: Frontiers	98	—	—	43	17	5	4	6	—	4	2	
Old Is New	Release date: November 30, 2018; Label: Columbia	—	—	—	—	—	—	—	—	—	—	—	
"—" denotes releases that did not chart

=== Live albums ===
Title	Album details	Peak chart positions					
Title	Album details	FIN	FRA	GER	JPN	NL	SWE
Absolutely Live	Release date: September 24, 1993; Label: Columbia	30	—	76	39	23	35
Livefields	Release date: September 27, 1999; Label: Columbia	—	25	57	—	39	—
25th Anniversary: Live in Amsterdam	Release date: October 7, 2003; Label: Eagle	—	120	50	133	66	—
Falling in Between Live	Release date: August 17, 2007 (Europe), November 13, 2007 (US); Label: Eagle	—	81	49	—	88	—
35th Anniversary: Live in Poland (Recorded live at the Atlas Arena, Lodz, Poland June 25, 2013)	Release date: April 29, 2014; Label: Eagle	—	78	6	—	31	—
Live at Montreux 1991	Release date: September 16, 2016; Label: Eagle	—	147	66	—	—	—
40 Tours Around the Sun (Recorded live at the Ziggo Dome in Amsterdam on March 17, 2018)	Release date: May 24, 2019; Label: Eagle	—	114	9	194	—	—
With a Little Help from My Friends (Live performance at SIR Studios, Los Angeles, CA, USA on November 21, 2020)	Release date: June 25, 2021; Label: Mascot Label Group, The Players Club	—	77	6	29	3	—
"—" denotes releases that did not chart

=== Soundtrack albums ===
Title	Album details	Peak positions
Title	Album details	US
Dune	Release date: November 1, 1984; Label: Polydor	168

=== Compilation albums ===
Title	Album details	Peak chart positions									Certifications (sales threshold)
Title	Album details	US	NOR	FIN	SWE	SWI	GER	NZ	NL	JPN	Certifications (sales threshold)
Past to Present 1977–1990	Release date: June 18, 1990; Label: Columbia	153	9	8	9	8	13	—	1	28	RIAA: Platinum; ARIA: Gold; BPI: Silver; BVMI: Gold; IFPI FIN: Gold; NVPI: Platinum; RIAJ: Platinum
Best Ballads	Release date: January 18, 1995; Label: Columbia	—	98	170	90	32	31	61	19	100	
Legend: The Best of Toto	Release date: July 11, 1996; Label: Columbia	—	—	10	—	—	—	—	—	—	IFPI FIN: Gold
Greatest Hits	Release date: December 4, 1996; Label: Columbia	—	3	—	—	—	63	—	—	—	IFPI NOR: Platinum
Toto XX	Release date: April 1, 1998 (Europe), November 1998 (US); Label: Sony Legacy	—	7	28	39	173	50	96	44	30	
Super Hits	Release date: June 5, 2001; Label: Eagle	—	—	—	—	—	—	—	—	—	
Hold the Line – The Very Best of Toto	Release date: October 2001; Label: Sony Music Distribution	—	—	—	4	—	—	—	—	—	
The Very Best of Toto	Release date: October 14, 2002; Label: Sony Music Distribution	—	107	47	29	85	—	38	—	71	
Greatest Hits ...and More	Release date: December 16, 2002; Label: Sony Music Distribution	—	—	—	—	—	—	—	67	—	
Love Songs	Release date: January 20, 2003; Label: Columbia	—	—	—	—	—	—	—	—	—	
Africa	Release date: April 14, 2003; Label: Columbia	—	—	—	—	—	—	—	—	—	
The Essential Toto	Release date: September 30, 2003; Label: Columbia	—	2	18	56	—	—	—	—	—	IFPI NOR: Gold
Rosanna – The Very Best of Toto	Release date: February 14. 2005; Label: Columbia	—	127	70	159	53	160	100	87	37	
The Very Best of Toto & Foreigner (with Foreigner)	Release date: August 17, 2007; Label: Sony BMG	—	191	51	—	84	173	20	—	122	
Hit Collection	Release date: December 28, 2007; Label: Sony BMG	—	—	—	—	—	—	—	—	—	
The Collection	Release date: March 17, 2008; Label: Sony BMG	—	—	31	177	—	—	39	100	—	
Playlist: The Very Best of Toto	Release date: April 17, 2009; Label: Sony Music	—	—	71	—	—	—	—	—	—	
Africa – The Best of Toto	Release date: June 15, 2009; Label: Camden	—	—	—	—	—	—	—	—	—	
Gold – Greatest Hits	Release date: October 30, 2009; Label: Sony Music	—	—	—	—	—	—	—	—	—	
Greatest Love Songs: Toto	Release date: January 4, 2011; Label: Sony Music	—	—	71	—	—	—	—	—	—	
The Best of the Best Platinum Toto	Release date: November 15, 2011; Label: Columbia, Legacy	—	—	—	—	—	—	—	—	—	
In the Blink of an Eye: Greatest Hits 1977–2011	Release date: November 15, 2011; Label: Columbia, Legacy	—	—	—	—	—	—	—	—	51	
Hold the Line: The Ultimate Collection	Release date: October 9, 2015; Label: Columbia, Legacy	—	—	—	—	—	—	—	—	—	
40 Trips Around the Sun	Release date: February 9, 2018; Label: Columbia, Legacy	82	—	39	26	8	8	—	13	24	BPI: Silver
"—" denotes releases that did not chart

=== Box sets ===
Title	Album details	Peak chart positions	
Title	Album details	GER	NL
All In 1978-2018	Release date: November 30, 2018; Label: Columbia, Legacy	—	—
All In 1978–2018 (Note: CD only release)	Release date: May 24, 2019; Label: Columbia, Legacy	38	91
"—" denotes releases that did not chart

== Singles ==
Year	Title	Peak chart positions										Certifications (sales threshold)	Album
Year	Title	US	US Main	US AC	CAN	AUS	BEL	GER	NL	NZ	UK	Certifications (sales threshold)	Album
1978	"Hold the Line"	5	—	—	5	8	—	23	19	11	14	RIAA: 3× Platinum; ARIA: Platinum; BPI: Gold; RMNZ: 4× Platinum	Toto
1979	"I'll Supply the Love"	45	—	—	73	92	—	—	—	29	—		Toto
1979	"Georgy Porgy"	48	—	49	49	65	—	—	—	11	—	RMNZ: Gold	Toto
1979	"Rockmaker" (Note: released in The Netherlands)	—	—	—	—	—	—	—	—	—	—		Toto
1979	"99"	26	—	19	17	97	—	—	—	11	—		Hydra
1980	"St. George and the Dragon"	—	—	—	—	—	—	—	—	—	—		Hydra
1980	"All Us Boys" (Note: released in US/Canada)	—	—	—	—	—	—	—	—	—	—		Hydra
1981	"Goodbye Elenore"	107	—	—	—	—	—	—	—	—	—		Turn Back
1981	"If It's the Last Night"	—	—	—	—	—	—	—	—	—	—		Turn Back
1981	"Live for Today"	—	40	—	—	—	—	—	—	—	—		Turn Back
1982	"Rosanna"	2	8	17	4	16	20	24	6	22	12	RIAA: 2× Platinum; ARIA: Gold; BPI: Gold; RMNZ: 2× Platinum	Toto IV
1982	"Africa"	1	—	5	1	5	7	14	4	5	3	RIAA: Diamond; ARIA: 14× Platinum; BPI: 6× Platinum; BVMI: 2× Platinum; RMNZ: 11× Platinum	Toto IV
1982	"Make Believe"	30	—	—	—	—	—	70	—	—	—		Toto IV
1982	"Afraid of Love" (Note: released in Japan)	—	28	—	—	—	—	—	—	—	—		Toto IV
1982	"Lovers in the Night"	—	57	—	—	—	—	—	—	—	—		Toto IV
1983	"I Won't Hold You Back"	10	—	1	17	80	—	—	11	—	37		Toto IV
1983	"Waiting for Your Love"	73	—	—	—	—	—	—	—	—	—		Toto IV
1984	"Dune (Main Title / Desert Theme)"	—	—	—	—	—	—	—	—	—	—		Dune
1984	"Stranger in Town"	30	7	—	16	40	—	—	—	—	100		Isolation
1985	"Holyanna"	71	—	—	—	—	—	—	—	—	—		Isolation
1985	"How Does It Feel"	—	—	—	—	—	—	—	—	—	—		Isolation
1985	"Endless" (Note: released in the UK)	—	—	—	—	—	—	—	—	—	—		Isolation
1986	"I'll Be Over You"	11	—	1	34	—	—	—	38	—	—	RIAA: Gold	Fahrenheit
1986	"Till the End"	—	—	—	—	—	—	—	—	—	—		Fahrenheit
1986	"Without Your Love"	38	—	7	77	—	—	—	64	—	—		Fahrenheit
1987	"Lea" (Note: released in the Netherlands)	—	—	—	—	—	—	—	—	—	—		Fahrenheit
1988	"Pamela"	22	—	9	32	—	10	—	8	—	—		The Seventh One
1988	"Stop Loving You"	—	—	—	—	—	2	—	2	—	96		The Seventh One
1988	"Straight for the Heart" (Note: released in US/Canada)	—	—	—	—	—	—	—	—	—	—		The Seventh One
1988	"Anna" (Note: released in US)	—	—	47	—	—	—	—	—	—	—		The Seventh One
1988	"Mushanga"	—	—	—	—	—	27	—	16	—	—		The Seventh One
1990	"Love Has the Power"	—	—	—	—	—	—	—	22	—	—		Past to Present 1977-1990
1990	"Out of Love"	—	—	—	—	—	—	—	17	—	—		Past to Present 1977-1990
1990	"Africa" "Can You Hear What I'm Saying"	— —	—	— —	— —	— —	— —	— —	32; 44	— —	80		Past to Present 1977-1990
1992	"Don't Chain My Heart"	—	—	—	—	173	—	—	12	—	—		Kingdom of Desire
1992	"Only You"	—	—	—	—	—	—	—	—	—	—		Kingdom of Desire
1992	"2 Hearts"	—	—	—	—	—	—	—	—	—	—		Kingdom of Desire
1992	"The Other Side"	—	—	—	—	—	—	—	—	—	—		Kingdom of Desire
1993	"Africa" (Live) (Note: released in France)	—	—	—	—	—	—	—	—	—	—		Absolutely Live
1993	"With a Little Help from My Friends" (Live)	—	—	—	—	—	—	—	—	—	—		Absolutely Live
1994	"I'll Be Over You" (Live)	—	—	—	—	—	—	—	—	—	—		Absolutely Live
1995	"I Will Remember"	—	—	—	—	—	—	82	41	—	64		Tambu
1995	"Drag Him to the Roof" (Note: released in Japan)	—	—	—	—	—	—	—	—	—	—		Tambu
1995	"The Other End of Time"	—	—	—	—	—	—	—	—	—	—		Tambu
1995	"Just Can't Get to You"	—	—	—	—	—	—	—	—	—	—		Tambu
1996	"The Turning Point"	—	—	—	—	—	—	—	—	—	—		Tambu
1996	"If You Belong to Me"	—	—	—	—	—	—	—	—	—	—		Tambu
1998	"Goin' Home"	—	—	—	—	—	—	99	—	—	—		Toto XX
1999	"Melanie"	—	—	—	—	—	—	—	64	—	—		Mindfields
2002	"Could You Be Loved"	—	—	—	—	—	—	—	—	—	—		Through the Looking Glass
2006	"Bottom of Your Soul"	—	—	—	—	—	—	—	32	—	—		Falling in Between
2015	"Orphan"	—	—	—	—	—	—	—	—	—	—		Toto XIV
2015	"Holy War"	—	—	—	—	—	—	—	—	—	—		Toto XIV
2015	"China Town"	—	—	—	—	—	—	—	—	—	—		Toto XIV
2017	"Alone"	—	—	—	—	—	—	—	—	—	—		40 Trips Around the Sun
2018	"Spanish Sea"	—	—	—	—	—	—	—	—	—	—		40 Trips Around the Sun
2018	"We'll Keep On Running" (with What So Not)	—	—	—	—	—	—	—	—	—	—		Old Is New / Not All the Beautiful Things
"—" denotes releases that did not chart

== Music videos ==
Year	Title	Album
1978	"Hold the Line"	Toto
1978	"I'll Supply the Love"	Toto
1978	"Georgy Porgy"	Toto
1979	"99"	Hydra
1980	"Hydra"	Hydra
1980	"St. George and the Dragon"	Hydra
1980	"All Us Boys"	Hydra
1981	"Goodbye Elenore"	Turn Back
1981	"Live for Today"	Turn Back
1982	"Rosanna"	Toto IV
1982	"Africa"	Toto IV
1982	"Waiting for Your Love"	Toto IV
1984	"Stranger in Town"	Isolation
1984	"Holyanna"	Isolation
1984	"Angel Don't Cry"	Isolation
1984	"How Does It Feel"	Isolation
1986	"I'll Be Over You" (with Michael McDonald)	Fahrenheit
1986	"Without Your Love"	Fahrenheit
1986	"Till the End"	Fahrenheit
1988	"Pamela"	The Seventh One
1988	"Stop Loving You"	The Seventh One
1988	"Straight for the Heart"	The Seventh One
1990	"Out of Love"	Past to Present 1977-1990
1990	"Can You Hear What I'm Saying"	Past to Present 1977-1990
1992	"Don't Chain My Heart"	Kingdom of Desire
1992	"Only You"	Kingdom of Desire
1995	"I Will Remember"	Tambu
1995	"The Turning Point"	Tambu
1999	"Melanie"	Mindfields
1999	"Cruel"	Mindfields
2015	"Orphan"	Toto XIV
2015	"Chinatown"	Toto XIV
2019	"Devil's Tower" (lyric video)	Old Is New
