= The Collection (Toto box set) =

Compilation album by Toto
- Released: March 17, 2008
- Genre: Rock
- Length: 3:01:58
- Label: Columbia

Toto chronology
Falling in Between Live (2007)	The Collection (2008)	Toto XIV (2015)

Professional ratings
Review scores
Source	Rating
AllMusic	4/5 stars

The Collection is a box set by American rock band Toto. It consists of the band's first seven albums on CD and a DVD of Greatest Hits Live and More (released in 1992 on VHS under the title Toto Live, then on DVD in 2002), a concert recorded at Le Zénith, Paris, in October 1990.

== Track listing ==
=== Disc 1: Toto ===
1. "Child's Anthem"
2. "I'll Supply the Love"
3. "Georgy Porgy"
4. "Manuela Run"
5. "You Are the Flower"
6. "Girl Goodbye"
7. "Takin' It Back"
8. "Rockmaker"
9. "Hold the Line"
10. "Angela"

=== Disc 2: Hydra ===
1. "Hydra"
2. "St. George and the Dragon"
3. "99"
4. "Lorraine"
5. "All Us Boys"
6. "Mama"
7. "White Sister"
8. "Secret Love"

=== Disc 3: Turn Back ===
1. "Gift with a Golden Gun"
2. "English Eyes"
3. "Live for Today"
4. "Million Miles Away"
5. "Goodbye Elenore"
6. "I Think I Could Stand You Forever"
7. "Turn Back"
8. "If It's the Last Night"

=== Disc 4: Toto IV ===
1. "Rosanna"
2. "Make Believe"
3. "I Won't Hold You Back"
4. "Good for You"
5. "It's a Feeling"
6. "Afraid of Love"
7. "Lovers in the Night"
8. "We Made It"
9. "Waiting for Your Love"
10. "Africa"

=== Disc 5: Isolation ===
1. "Carmen"
2. "Lion"
3. "Stranger in Town"
4. "Angel Don't Cry"
5. "How Does It Feel"
6. "Endless"
7. "Isolation"
8. "Mr. Friendly"
9. "Change of Heart"
10. "Holyanna"

=== Disc 6: Fahrenheit ===
1. "Till the End"
2. "We Can Make It Tonight"
3. "Without Your Love"
4. "Can't Stand It Any Longer"
5. "I'll Be over You"
6. "Fahrenheit"
7. "Somewhere Tonight"
8. "Could This Be Love"
9. "Lea"
10. "Don't Stop Me Now"

=== Disc 7: The Seventh One ===
1. "Pamela"
2. "You Got Me"
3. "Anna"
4. "Stop Loving You"
5. "Mushanga"
6. "Stay Away"
7. "Straight for the Heart"
8. "Only the Children"
9. "Thousand Years"
10. "These Chains"
11. "Home of the Brave"

=== Disc 8: Greatest Hits Live...and More (DVD) ===
1. "Intro (Child's Anthem)"
2. "Africa"
3. "Georgy Porgy"
4. "I'll Be Over You"
5. "David Paich Solo Spot"
6. "I Won't Hold You Back"
7. "Little Wing"
8. "Without Your Love"
9. "English Eyes"
10. "Rosanna"
11. "Afraid of Love"
12. "Hold the Line"
13. Bonus Materials

== Charts ==
Chart (2008)	Peak position
Danish Albums (Hitlisten)	3
Finnish Albums (Suomen virallinen lista)	31
