= 40 Trips Around the Sun =

Greatest hits album by Toto
- Released: February 9, 2018
- Recorded: 1978–2017
- Length: 79:19
- Label: Columbia; Legacy

Toto chronology
| Toto XIV (2015) | 40 Trips Around the Sun (2018) | Old Is New (2018) |

40 Trips Around the Sun is a greatest hits album by American rock band Toto, released on February 9, 2018. The album was released in commemoration of the 40th anniversary of Toto's self-titled debut album (1978).

40 Trips Around the Sun contains 14 tracks from 1978 to 1993, and three previously unreleased recordings ("Spanish Sea", "Alone" and "Struck by Lightning"). "Spanish Sea" was recorded during the sessions for Isolation (1984), and was re-written with a new chorus. Steve Lukather said of the song: "Thanks to modern tech we were able to play once again with not only our 20 something selves but with our dear brothers Jeff and Mike Porcaro reminding us just how deep their groove was. Bittersweet... Many stories, laughs and a few tears on this one". "Alone" is a newly written song by Toto members David Paich, Steve Lukather, Steve Porcaro and Joseph Williams, while "Struck by Lightning" was previously unreleased.

== Track listing ==
| No. | Title | Writer(s) | Lead vocals | Length |
|---|---|---|---|---|
| 1. | "Alone" (newly recorded) | David Paich, Steve Lukather, Steve Porcaro, Joseph Williams | Williams | 4:32 |
| 2. | "Spanish Sea" (newly recorded) | Paich, Lukather, S. Porcaro, Williams | Paich, Williams | 4:20 |
| 3. | "I'll Supply the Love" (from Toto, 1978) | Paich | Bobby Kimball | 3:44 |
| 4. | "I'll Be Over You" (from Fahrenheit, 1986) | Randy Goodrum, Lukather | Lukather | 3:50 |
| 5. | "Stranger in Town" (from Isolation, 1984) | Paich, Jeff Porcaro | Paich | 4:47 |
| 6. | "99" (from Hydra, 1979) | Paich | Lukather | 5:13 |
| 7. | "Struck by Lightning" (newly recorded) | Paich, Lukather, S. Porcaro, Williams | Williams | 4:15 |
| 8. | "Pamela" (from The Seventh One, 1988) | Paich, Williams | Williams | 5:09 |
| 9. | "Afraid of Love" (from Toto IV, 1982) | Lukather, Paich, J. Porcaro | Lukather | 3:52 |
| 10. | "I Won't Hold You Back" (from Toto IV) | Lukather | Lukather | 4:53 |
| 11. | "Jake to the Bone" (from Kingdom of Desire, 1992) | Lukather, Paich, J. Porcaro, Mike Porcaro | instrumental | 7:04 |
| 12. | "Stop Loving You" (from The Seventh One) | Lukather, Paich | Williams | 4:29 |
| 13. | "Lea" (from Fahrenheit) | S. Porcaro | Williams | 4:30 |
| 14. | "Hold the Line" (from Toto) | Paich | Kimball | 3:55 |
| 15. | "Georgy Porgy" (from Toto) | Paich | Lukather | 4:08 |
| 16. | "Rosanna" (from Toto IV) | Paich | Lukather, Kimball | 5:31 |
| 17. | "Africa" (from Toto IV) | Paich, J. Porcaro | Paich, Kimball | 4:55 |
| Total length: | | | | 79:19 |

== Personnel ==
"Alone"

- Steve Lukather: guitars, bass, backing vocals
- David Paich: piano, keyboards
- Steve Porcaro: synthesizers
- Joseph Williams: lead and backing vocals, additional keyboards
- Vinnie Colaiuta: drums
- Lenny Castro: percussion

"Spanish Sea"

- Jeff Porcaro: drums
- Mike Porcaro: bass
- Steve Lukather: guitars, backing vocals
- David Paich: piano, keyboards, lead and backing vocals
- Steve Porcaro: synthesizer, backing vocals
- Joseph Williams: lead and backing vocals, additional keyboards
- Lenny Castro: percussion
- Mark T. Williams, Timothy B. Schmit: backing vocals

"Struck by Lightning"

- Steve Lukather: guitars, bass
- David Paich: keyboards, backing vocals
- Steve Porcaro: Hammond organs
- Joseph Williams: lead vocals, keyboards
- Vinnie Colaiuta: drums
- Martin Tillman: cello
- Pat Knox, Lorraine Paich, Weston Wilson: backing vocals (lightning chant)

== Singles ==
- "Alone" / "Hold the Line"
- "Spanish Sea"

== Charts ==
| Chart (2018) | Peak position |
|---|---|
| Austrian Albums (Ö3 Austria) | 17 |
| Belgian Albums (Ultratop Flanders) | 20 |
| Belgian Albums (Ultratop Wallonia) | 64 |
| Croatian International Albums (HDU) | 17 |
| Dutch Albums (Album Top 100) | 13 |
| Finnish Albums (Suomen virallinen lista) | 39 |
| French Albums (SNEP) | 114 |
| German Albums (Offizielle Top 100) | 8 |
| Italian Albums (FIMI) | 53 |
| Japan Hot Albums (Billboard Japan) | 48 |
| Japanese Albums (Oricon) | 24 |
| Spanish Albums (PROMUSICAE) | 84 |
| Swedish Albums (Sverigetopplistan) | 26 |
| Swiss Albums (Schweizer Hitparade) | 8 |
| UK Albums (OCC) | 64 |
| US Billboard 200 | 82 |

== Certifications ==
| Region | Certification | Certified units/sales |
|---|---|---|
| France (SNEP) | Gold | 50,000^{‡} |
| United Kingdom (BPI) | Silver | 60,000^{‡} |
^{‡} Sales+streaming figures based on certification alone.
