= The Very Best of Toto =

The Very Best Of Toto

Compilation album by Toto
- Released: October 14, 2002
- Genre: Rock

The Very Best of Toto is a greatest-hits compilation album of the American band Toto, released on October 14, 2002.

== Track listing ==
1. "Africa"
2. "Hold the Line"
3. "Georgy Porgy"
4. "Rosanna"
5. "Don't Chain My Heart"
6. "I'll Be Over You"
7. "Waiting For Your Love"
8. "Stranger in Town"
9. "I Won't Hold You Back"
10. "Stop Loving You"
11. "99"
12. "Pamela"
13. "2 Hearts"
14. "I Will Remember"
15. "The Turning Point"
