= Super Hits (Toto album) =

Compilation album by Toto
- Released: 5 June 2001
- Recorded: 1977–1986
- Genre: Rock
- Label: Sony Music

Toto chronology
Livefields (1999)	Super Hits (2001)	Through the Looking Glass (2003)

Professional ratings
Review scores
Source	Rating
Allmusic	2.5/5 stars

Super Hits is a compilation album by American soft rock band Toto. It was released in 2001. The album has been repackaged under different several times, as Rosanna in 2004, as Collections in 2006 and as Toto in 2009.

== Track listing ==
1. Hold the Line
2. Rosanna
3. Africa
4. Georgy Porgy
5. Live for Today
6. 99
7. Without Your Love
8. St. George and the Dragon
9. Isolation
10. I'll Be over You
