= Falling in Between Live =

Live album by Toto
- Released: August 17, 2007 (Europe); November 13, 2007 (US)
- Recorded: March 26, 2007
- Venue: Le Zenith, Paris
- Genre: Rock
- Length: 112:06
- Label: Eagle
- Producer: Toto

Toto chronology
Falling in Between (2006)	Falling in Between Live (2007)	The Collection (2008)

Falling in Between Live is the fourth live album by American band Toto, released in 2007. It was recorded live at Le Zénith, Paris, France.

The album is the first Toto record to feature bassist Leland Sklar, who at the time was thought to be temporarily replacing Mike Porcaro, "due to a hand injury", however Porcaro had really begun to feel the first effects of ALS (Amyotrophic lateral sclerosis). It is also the last Toto album with original lead vocalist Bobby Kimball, as well as the second and final recording to feature keyboardist/vocalist Greg Phillinganes, who was added to the official line-up to return the band to the classic 2 keyboardist format, and to fill in the gap during live performances since David Paich had temporarily retired from touring, but was still an active member in the studio.

Professional ratings
Review scores
Source	Rating
AllMusic	link

== Track listing ==
=== Disc one ===
1. "Falling in Between" (Steve Lukather, David Paich, Simon Phillips, Mike Porcaro, Bobby Kimball, Greg Phillinganes) - 5:22
2. "King of the World" (Kimball, Lukather, Paich, Steve Porcaro, Phillips, M. Porcaro) - 5:32
3. "Pamela" (Paich, Joseph Williams) - 5:42
4. "Bottom of Your Soul" (Paich, Lukather, Phillips, Kimball, M. Porcaro) - 7:04
5. "Caught in the Balance" (Lukather, Paich, Phillips, M. Porcaro, Stan Lynch, Kimball) - 6:44
6. "Don't Chain My Heart" (Paich, Lukather, Jeff Porcaro, M. Porcaro) - 5:37
7. "Hold the Line" (Paich) - 4:22
8. "Stop Loving You" (Lukather, Paich) - 3:22
9. "I'll Be Over You" (Lukather, Randy Goodrum) - 2:29
10. "Cruel" (Jed Leiber, Phillips, Kimball, Lukather) - 2:44
11. "Greg Solo" (Phillinganes) - 6:21

=== Disc two ===
1. "Rosanna" (Paich) - 9:19
2. "I'll Supply the Love" (Paich) - 1:56
3. "Isolation" (Lukather, Paich, Fergie Frederiksen) - 2:50
4. "Gift of Faith" (Lukather, Paich, Lynch) - 2:37
5. "Kingdom of Desire" (Danny Kortchmar) - 2:51
6. "Luke Solo" (Lukather) - 6:07
7. "Hydra" (Paich, S. Porcaro, J. Porcaro, Lukather, Kimball, David Hungate) - 2:04
8. "Simon Solo" (Phillips) - 3:42
9. "Taint Your World" (Lukather, Paich, Phillips, Kimball, M. Porcaro) - 2:07
10. "Gypsy Train" (Paich, Lukather, J. Porcaro, M. Porcaro) - 7:10
11. "Africa" (Paich, J. Porcaro) - 6:15
12. "Drag Him to the Roof" (Lukather, Paich, Lynch) - 9:14

== Personnel ==
- Bobby Kimball – lead and backing vocals
- Steve Lukather – guitars, backing vocals, lead vocal on 'Bottom of Your Soul', 'Don't Chain My Heart', 'I'll Be Over You', 'Gift of Faith', 'Kingdom of Desire' and 'Gypsy Train' co-lead vocals on 'King of the World' and 'Rosanna'
- Greg Phillinganes – keyboards, backing vocals, lead vocal on 'Africa', co-lead vocals on 'Falling in Between', 'King of the World' and 'Drag Him to the Roof'
- Simon Phillips – drums, percussion

Additional musicians

- Tony Spinner – guitars, backing vocals, lead vocal on 'Stop Loving You', co-lead vocals on 'Drag Him to the Roof'
- Leland Sklar – bass

Technical personnel

- Filip Jacobs – engineer
- Steve MacMillan – mixing
- Brian Holder – digital sound editing
- Jon Astley – mastering
