= The Seventh One =

Studio album by Toto
- Released: February 8, 1988 (US, EU) February 26, 1988 (JP)
- Recorded: 1987
- Studios: The Complex (Los Angeles); The Manor (Los Angeles); Additional recording: A&M (Hollywood)
- Genres: Arena rock; hard rock; pop rock; soft rock
- Length: 53:58; 60:10 (Japanese version)
- Label: Columbia
- Producers: Toto; George Massenburg; Bill Payne

Toto chronology
Fahrenheit (1986)	The Seventh One (1988)	Past to Present 1977–1990 (1990)

Singles from The Seventh One
- 1. "Pamela" Released: February 1988 (US); 2. "Stop Loving You" Released: March 1988 (EU); 3. "Straight for the Heart" Released: April 1988; 4. "Anna" Released: August 1988 (US); 5. "Mushanga" Released: September 1988 (EU)

The Seventh One is the seventh studio album by the American rock band Toto. It was released on February 8, 1988, and became the best-received Toto album since Toto IV. The title track, "The Seventh One", is featured only on the Japanese version of the album and on the B-side of the single "Pamela". It was also released on some compilations on a later date. It would be their second and last studio album with lead vocalist Joseph Williams until Toto XIV (2015).

== Background and recording ==
Steve Lukather described the writing of The Seventh One as a period of prolific "one-upmanship" with the band trying to impress one another with their compositions. One of the first compositions completed was the ballad "Anna", written by Lukather and Randy Goodrum. Lukather considers the song to be one of his best compositions. "Anna" was followed by "Pamela," written by David Paich, described as the "heir apparent" to "Rosanna." Paich and Lukather then composed "Stop Loving You," which both believed was sure to become a hit. Joseph Williams's influence on the album extended well beyond his vocals, with co-writing credit on six of the eleven tracks. The producer of The Seventh One, George Massenburg felt the album was missing a "rocker," which led to the composition and recording of the seven-minute closing track, "Home of the Brave." To assist in writing the lyrics, Toto called on Jimmy Webb.

During the recording of The Seventh One, keyboardist Steve Porcaro announced he was leaving the band. His decision to leave was partly influenced by his belief his contributions were not well represented in the band's music and a general feeling of being unappreciated. Porcaro was also noted to be unhappy with the level of drug and alcohol use in the band at the time. Despite his refusal to participate in the band business or publicity, Porcaro continued to contribute to the recording of The Seventh One and was paid as a studio musician. He also toured with the band in Europe.

== Reception ==
Professional ratings
Review scores
Source	Rating
AllMusic	2/5 stars
Los Angeles Times	1.5/4 stars
People	(favourable)
Sun Sentinel	(favourable)

By its conclusion, Toto, as well as Columbia Records, believed The Seventh One was one of the band's strongest albums. The first single, "Pamela", was heavily promoted by Columbia. However, shortly after its release, the president of Columbia, Al Teller, left the label. In his absence, the promotion of "Pamela" waned and it stalled at number 22 on the Billboard Hot 100 and quickly dropped off the chart. "Pamela" was the band's last top 30 hit in the United States and Lukather described its quick drop out of the Hot 100 as "the moment that our star dwindled in America and it would take years for us to recover momentum". The Seventh One was the first Toto album since Turn Back to have fewer than two charting hits in the US, and was the lowest charting Toto album on the Billboard charts up to that point.

In Europe, "Stop Loving You" was the album's first single where it reached the top ten in several countries. Following the album's release, Toto embarked on a tour of sold-out arena shows in Europe. While Joseph Williams's vocals were not a point of contention during the Fahrenheit tour, he struggled with his vocals during the European tour, likely as a result of substance use. In particular, Williams was unable to perform during Toto's first show in Amsterdam, a show which was simultaneously broadcast live on national radio. Efforts were made to control Williams's drug use; yet Jeff Porcaro ultimately fired him from the band, declaring, "I can't make anything click with a guy who's this way. Either he packs up and goes home, or I do." Williams was the third vocalist fired from Toto due to inability to perform vocals, following the previous terminations of Bobby Kimball and Fergie Frederiksen. He would later contribute guest vocals to the Falling in Between album and return as the permanent lead vocalist in 2010.

Cash Box called the second American single "Straight for the Heart" a "plateful of pop rock, filled with hooks and dynamic production licks that cry out for extensive radio play" and "the strongest Toto yet."

== Legacy ==
In 2017, Ultimate Classic Rock ranked the album as Toto's second best, behind only Toto IV.

== Track listing ==
Side one
No.	Title	Writer(s)	Length
1.	"Pamela"	David Paich, Joseph Williams	5:11
2.	"You Got Me"	Paich, J. Williams	3:11
3.	"Anna"	Steve Lukather, Randy Goodrum	4:58
4.	"Stop Loving You"	Paich, Lukather	4:29
5.	"Mushanga"	Paich, Jeff Porcaro	5:35
6.	"Stay Away"	Paich, Lukather	5:31

Side two
No.	Title	Writer(s)	Length
7.	"Straight for the Heart"	Paich, J. Williams	4:09
8.	"Only the Children"	Paich, Lukather, J. Williams	4:11
9.	"A Thousand Years"	Paich, J. Williams, Mark Towner Williams	4:53
10.	"These Chains"	Lukather, Goodrum	4:59
11.	"Home of the Brave"	Paich, Lukather, J. Williams, Jimmy Webb	6:51
Total length:			53:58

Bonus track on Japanese copies of the album
No.	Title	Writer(s)	Length
12.	"The Seventh One"	Paich, Lukather, J. Williams, J. Porcaro, Mike Porcaro	6:20
Total length:			60:18

== Personnel ==
=== Toto ===
- Joseph Williams – lead vocals (1, 2, 4–9, 11, 12), backing vocals
- Steve Lukather – guitars, lead vocals (3, 10), backing vocals
- David Paich – keyboards, synthesizers, lead vocals (11), backing vocals, horn arrangements (2), string arrangements (3, 9–11), conductor (9, 10)
- Mike Porcaro – bass
- Jeff Porcaro – drums, percussion

==== Additional musicians ====
- Lenny Castro – percussion (2)
- Jim Keltner – percussion (2)
- Michael Fisher – percussion (3, 4)
- Joe Porcaro – vibes (1, 10), percussion (3, 5)
- Andy Narell – steel drums (5)
- Steve Porcaro – synthesizers, programming
- Bill Payne – synthesizers (4)
- David Lindley – lap steel (6)
- Jim Horn – saxophone (1, 2, 4, 7, 10), recorders (5), flute (5)
- Tom Scott – saxophone (1, 2, 4, 10), horn arrangements (1, 4, 10)
- Gary Herbig – saxophone (1, 2, 4, 10)
- Jerry Hey – trumpet (1, 2, 4, 10), horn arrangements (2)
- Chuck Findley – trumpet (1, 2, 4, 10)
- James Pankow – trombone (1, 2, 4, 10)
- Gary Grant – trumpet (1, 2, 4, 10)
- Marty Paich – string arrangements (3), conductor (3, 11)
- James Newton Howard – string arrangements (3)
- Tom Kelly – backing vocals (1, 8)
- Patti Austin – backing vocals (2, 5, 7)
- Jon Anderson – backing vocals (4)
- Linda Ronstadt – backing vocals (6)

=== Technical ===
- Produced and recorded by George Massenburg, Bill Payne, and Toto
- Additional engineers – Sharon Rice, John Jessel, and Steve Porcaro
- Assistant engineers – Paul Dieter, Ken Fowler, Duane Seykora, Mark McKenna, Greg Dennen, and Scott Symington
- Mixed by Niko Bolas (6)
- Mastered by Doug Sax and Mike Reese at The Mastering Lab (Los Angeles, CA)
- Technicians – Bob Bradshaw (guitars), Ross Garfield (drums), Paul Jamieson (drums), and John Jessel (keyboards)
- Technicians (at The Complex) – Paul Dwyer, Nathaniel Kunkel, and Robert Spano
- Production management – Ivy Skoff
- Art direction – Tony Lane and Nancy Donald
- Design – Jeff Porcaro (front cover), Margo Nahas (illustration), and Philip Garris (original art)
- Photography – Dennis Keeley (back cover/inside) and Glen LaFerman (inside)

== Singles ==
- Pamela / The Seventh One (released in US)
- Pamela / You Got Me (released in Europe and Japan)
- Pamela / Stay Away (released in UK)
- Stop Loving You / The Seventh One (released in Europe)
- Straight For The Heart / The Seventh One (released in US and Canada)
- Anna / The Seventh One (released in US)
- Mushanga / Straight for the Heart (released in Europe)

== Charts and certifications ==
=== Weekly charts ===
Chart (1988)	Peak position
Austrian Albums (Ö3 Austria)	9
Canada Top Albums/CDs (RPM)	54
Dutch Albums (Album Top 100)	1
Finnish Charts (Suomen virallinen lista)	3
French Albums (SNEP)	19
German Albums (Offizielle Top 100)	10
Japanese Albums (Oricon)	3
Norwegian Albums (VG-lista)	4
Swedish Albums (Sverigetopplistan)	2
Swiss Albums (Schweizer Hitparade)	4
UK Albums (Official Charts)	73
US Billboard 200	64

=== Year-end charts ===
Chart (1988)	Position
Dutch Albums (Album Top 100)	3
French Albums (SNEP)	55

=== Certifications ===
Region	Certification	Certified units/sales
France (SNEP)	2× Gold	200,000^{*}
Japan (Oricon Charts)	—	141,170
Netherlands (NVPI)	Platinum	100,000^{^}
Sweden (GLF)	Platinum	100,000^{^}
^{*} Sales figures based on certification alone.^{^} Shipments figures based on certification alone.
