= Live for Today (song) =

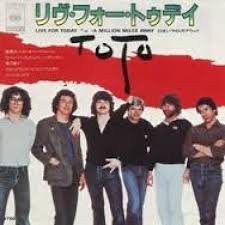

Single by Toto

from the album Turn Back
- B-side: "A Million Miles Away" (Japan); "English Eyes" (Australia)
- Released: April 17, 1981 (Australia)
- Recorded: 1980
- Genre: Hard rock; power pop
- Length: 4:00
- Label: Columbia
- Songwriter: Steve Lukather
- Producers: Toto; Geoff Workman

Toto singles chronology
"If It's the Last Night" (1981)	"Live for Today" (1981)	"Rosanna" (1982)

"Live for Today" is a song by the American rock band Toto. It was released on their 1981 album Turn Back, and was released in Australia and Japan as the final single from that album. American radio picked up the song, which resulted in it reaching No. 40 on the US Mainstream Rock Chart.

"Live for Today" was the first song that Steve Lukather received full writing credits for the band. On the song, Lukather played a Schecter Stratocaster for the rhythm guitar part and double tracked the guitar solo on a Gibson Les Paul for the solo, which according to Lukather was the part that he doubled on Turn Back.

== Personnel ==
- Steve Lukather – guitars, vocals
- Steve Porcaro – synthesizers, electronics
- David Paich – keyboards
- David Hungate – bass guitar
- Jeff Porcaro – drums, percussion

== Charts ==
Chart performance for "Live for Today"
Chart (1981)	Peak position
US Mainstream Rock (Billboard)	40
