= Anna (Toto song) =

- Side A of the US 7" single

Single by Toto

from the album The Seventh One
- B-side: "The Seventh One"
- Released: 1988
- Recorded: 1987
- Genre: Soft rock
- Length: 4:58 (album version); 4:03 (single version)
- Label: Columbia
- Songwriters: Steve Lukather; Randy Goodrum
- Producers: George Massenburg; Bill Payne; Toto

Toto singles chronology
"Straight for the Heart" (1988)	"Anna" (1988)	"Mushanga" (1988)

"Anna" is a song performed by Toto, written by the band's guitarist Steve Lukather and Randy Goodrum. Released as the fourth single from the album The Seventh One, it peaked at No. 47 on the Billboard Hot Adult Contemporary chart in October 1988. It was the band's final appearance on that chart. Lukather considers the track to be one of his best compositions.

== Personnel ==
=== Toto ===
- Steve Lukather – lead vocals, guitars
- Joseph Williams – backing vocals
- David Paich – keyboards, backing vocals, string arrangements
- Mike Porcaro – bass
- Jeff Porcaro – drums, percussion

=== Guest musicians ===
- Michael Fisher – percussion
- Joe Porcaro – percussion
- Steve Porcaro – synthesizers, programming
- Marty Paich – string arrangements, conductor
- James Newton Howard – string arrangements

== Charts ==
Chart (1988)	Peak position
US Adult Contemporary (Billboard)	47
