= Toto XIV =

Studio album by Toto
- Released: March 20, 2015
- Recorded: January 2014–c. October 2014
- Studios: The Treehouse (North Hollywood); Capitol (Hollywood); ATS (Calabasas); Porcara Musica (Los Angeles); Digby Road (Thousand Oaks)
- Genres: Hard rock; pop rock; jazz rock; blues rock; progressive rock
- Length: 56:03
- Label: Frontiers
- Producers: CJ Vanston; Steve Lukather; David Paich; Steve Porcaro; Joseph Williams

Toto chronology
The Collection (2008)	Toto XIV (2015)	40 Trips Around the Sun (2018)

Singles from Toto XIV
- 1. "Orphan" Released: February 5, 2015; 2. "Holy War" Released: February 17, 2015; 3. "Burn" Released: March 3, 2015

Toto XIV is the thirteenth studio album by the American rock band Toto (though the band's fourteenth album overall, when one counts Toto XX). Toto released the album on March 20, 2015. It is the band's first studio album since Falling in Between in 2006.

The album marks the return of Joseph Williams on lead vocals, Steve Porcaro on keyboards and vocals, and original bassist David Hungate (while the latter left the band several months later, he appeared on select tracks on the band's following album Old Is New in 2018) and the only album with drummer Keith Carlock. It is also the first studio album since 1982's Toto IV not to feature longtime bassist Mike Porcaro, who had been inactive since 2007 due to ALS and died five days before the album's release.

== Background ==
Their final contractual obligation with Frontier Records, Toto made the record understanding that it likely would not make pop radio. With the return of Steve Porcaro and David Hungate, David Paich found the sessions to be "very cyclical", which was further helped by the location of their studio: it was located just a half mile away from where they recorded their eponymous debut. One song, "Chinatown", was actually written for the first album, but never fully developed until the Toto XIV recording sessions. The name was explained by band member Steve Lukather in December 2014: the band counted albums "with unreleased or new music only", so the album Toto XX (1998) was counted because it contained previously unreleased songs, making Toto XIV the 14th album.

== Reception ==
Professional ratings
Review scores
Source	Rating
AllMusic	3/5 stars

AllMusic's review of XIV described the album's title as a reference to their platinum-selling 1982 album Toto IV, but said that it "doesn't share much with that Yacht Rock classic. Despite the McCartney-esque shimmer of "The Little Things" (not to mention the passing allusions to "99" on "Chinatown"), tunes take a backseat to bombast on Toto XIV, with this Steve Lukather-led incarnation accentuating intricate instrumental interplay." The review also described a "furious first half, containing such plainly evident socio-political protests as "Holy War," "Running Out of Time," "Unknown Soldier," and "21st Century Blues"". It concludes that the band is "not living in the past, nor are they denying it: they're accepting all their indulgences, all the intricacies that come with their virtuosity, and making a record that reflects what these veteran rockers have seen and learned in their 40 years in the business."

== Track listing ==
No.	Title	Writer(s)	Lead vocals	Length
1.	"Running Out of Time"	Lukather; Paich; Williams	Joseph Williams	4:06
2.	"Burn"	Williams; Paich	Williams	4:56
3.	"Holy War"	Lukather; CJ Vanston; Williams	Williams & Steve Lukather	5:24
4.	"21st Century Blues"	Lukather; Vanston	Lukather	6:08
5.	"Orphan"	Paich; Williams; Lukather	Williams	3:55
6.	"Unknown Soldier (For Jeffrey)"	Paich; Lukather	Lukather	5:06
7.	"The Little Things"	Steve Porcaro; Allee Willis	Steve Porcaro	4:34
8.	"Chinatown"	Paich; Mike Sherwood	David Paich, Williams & Lukather	5:07
9.	"All the Tears That Shine"	Paich; Sherwood	Paich	5:09
10.	"Fortune"	Williams	Williams	4:46
11.	"Great Expectations"	Paich; Williams; Lukather	Paich, Williams & Lukather	6:48
Total length:				56:03

Japanese edition bonus track
No.	Title	Writer(s)	Lead vocals	Length
12.	"Bend"	Mike Sherwood, Steve Porcaro	Porcaro	2:48

== Personnel ==
Credits taken from album's liner notes.

=== Toto ===
- Steve Lukather – guitars (1–11), bass guitar (5, 6, 11), lead vocals (3, 4, 6, 8, 11), backing vocals (1–3, 5, 6, 8–11)
- Joseph Williams – lead vocals (1–3, 5, 8, 10, 11), backing vocals (1–11), keyboards (11), hand drumming on leather bench (2), additional keyboards (5)
- David Paich – piano (1, 3, 4, 9–11), keyboards (2, 5, 6, 8, 9, 11), organ (3, 4, 11), upright bass (9), lead vocals (8, 9, 11), backing vocals (2)
- Steve Porcaro – synthesizers (1–5, 8–12), keyboards (7), lead vocals (7, 12), samples (12)
- Keith Carlock – drums (1–11), backing vocals (2)
- David Hungate – bass guitar (3, 4, 7, 8)

==== Additional musicians ====
- CJ Vanston – additional synthesizers (1, 2, 4–6, 10, 11), additional keyboards (3), synthesizers (4), backing vocals (2), end vamp piano (4)
- Tim Lefebvre – bass guitar (1)
- Leland Sklar – bass guitar (2)
- Tal Wilkenfeld – bass guitar (9, 10)
- Lenny Castro – percussion (2, 3, 5–10)
- Tom Scott – saxophones (4, 8), horn arrangement (4)
- Martin Tillman – cello (6, 7, 11)
- Jamie Savko – backing vocals (1, 2, 11)
- Emma Williams – backing vocals (2)
- Amy Keys – backing vocals (4, 6, 8, 10)
- Mabvuto Carpenter – backing vocals (5, 11)
- Michael McDonald – backing vocals (6, 8, 10)

=== Technical ===
- Produced by CJ Vanston, David Paich (1–6, 8–11), Steve Lukather (1–6, 8–11), Joseph Williams (1–6, 8–11), and Steve Porcaro (7, 12)
- Engineered by CJ Vanston, Csaba Petrocz, Joseph Williams, Stefan Nordin
- Assistant engineers – Steve Genewick and Chandler Harod
- Mixed by CJ Vanston at The Treehouse (North Hollywood, CA)
- Mastered by Peter Doell at Universal Mastering (Los Angeles, CA)
- Photography – Heather Porcaro
- Art direction – Thunderwing
- Cover art – Fred Kim
- Production management – JoAnn Tominaga
- Business management – Ron Remis and Trish Field
- Legal affairs – Gary Gilbert at Manatt, Phelps & Phillips, LLP
- Public relations – Steve Karas and Keith Hagen

== Charts ==
=== Weekly charts ===
Chart (2015)	Peak position
Austrian Albums (Ö3 Austria)	11
Belgian Albums (Ultratop Flanders)	28
Belgian Albums (Ultratop Wallonia)	33
Czech Albums (ČNS IFPI)	10
South Korean Albums (Circle)	12
Danish Albums (Hitlisten)	7
Dutch Albums (Album Top 100)	2
Finnish Albums (Suomen virallinen lista)	5
French Albums (SNEP)	17
German Albums (Offizielle Top 100)	4
Hungarian Albums (MAHASZ)	15
Irish Albums (IRMA)	75
Italian Albums (FIMI)	16
Japanese Albums (Oricon)	2
Norwegian Albums (VG-lista)	6
Swedish Albums (Sverigetopplistan)	4
Swiss Albums (Schweizer Hitparade)	3
UK Albums (OCC)	43
US Billboard 200	98
US Top Rock Albums (Billboard)	18

=== Year-end charts ===
Chart (2015)	Position
Dutch Albums (Album Top 100)	88
