= Old Is New =

Studio album by Toto
- Released: November 30, 2018
- Recorded: 1981–1984, 2016–2017
- Length: 42:10
- Label: Columbia
- Producer: Toto

Toto chronology
40 Trips Around the Sun (2018)	Old Is New (2018)	With a Little Help From My Friends (2021)

Singles from Old Is New
- 1. "Alone" Released: November 15, 2017; 2. "Spanish Sea" Released: January 3, 2018; 3. "Struck by Lightning" Released: February 9, 2018; 4. "Devil's Tower" Released: January 24, 2019; 5. "Chelsea" Released: May 24, 2019; 6. "Fearful Heart" Released: April 3, 2020

Old Is New is the fourteenth and final studio album by American band Toto (though counted as the 15th album overall with Toto XX being canonized as a studio album rather than as a compilation album). It was released as part of the band's All In box set on November 30, 2018, and separately on April 3, 2020. The tracks "Devil's Tower", "Spanish Sea" and "Oh Why" feature deceased band members and brothers Jeff (who died in 1992) and Mike Porcaro (who died in 2015).

== Track listing ==
All tracks are written by Steve Lukather, David Paich, Steve Porcaro and Joseph Williams, except where noted.

No.	Title	Writer(s)	Lead vocals	Length
1.	"Alone"		Williams	4:32
2.	"Devil's Tower"		Lukather & Williams	3:44
3.	"Fearful Heart"		Williams	3:52
4.	"Spanish Sea"		Williams & Paich	4:25
5.	"In a Little While"	Paich; Porcaro	Lukather & Porcaro	4:49
6.	"Chelsea"		Williams	4:51
7.	"Chase the Rain"		Porcaro	3:16
8.	"Oh Why?"	Paich	Paich	3:55
9.	"Struck by Lightning"		Williams	4:17
10.	"We'll Keep On Running" (featuring What So Not)	Chris Emerson; George Maple; Lukather; Paich; Porcaro; James Rushent; Surahn Sidhu; Williams	Lukather & Williams	4:41
Total length:				42:10

- "Alone", "Spanish Sea" and "Struck by Lightning" were previously released on the greatest hits album 40 Trips Around the Sun (2018).

== Personnel ==
All credits sourced from liner notes:

=== Toto ===
- Steve Lukather – guitars, lead vocals (2, 5, 10), backing vocals (1–5, 8), bass guitar (1, 9), piano (3), sitar (8)
- David Paich – piano (1, 2, 4–6, 8, 9), keyboards (1–5, 8), additional keyboards (7), synthesizers (3), lead vocals (4, 8), backing vocals (4, 5, 9)
- Steve Porcaro – synthesizers (1–5, 7), Hammond organ (6, 8, 9), keyboards (3), piano (7), synth bass (7), lead vocals (5, 7), backing vocals (4, 5, 7)
- Joseph Williams – lead vocals (1–4, 6, 9, 10), backing vocals (1–9), keyboards (6, 9), additional keyboards (1, 4), piano (6), synth bass (6), arrangement (6)
- Jeff Porcaro – drums (2–5, 8)
- David Hungate – bass guitar (2, 5)
- Mike Porcaro – bass guitar (3, 4, 8)

=== Additional musicians ===
- Lenny Castro – percussion (1, 2, 4–6, 8)
- Vinnie Colaiuta – drums (1, 6, 9)
- Shannon Forrest – drums (7)
- Martin Tillman – cello (8, 9)
- Mark T. Williams – backing vocals (3, 4)
- Timothy B. Schmit – backing vocals (4)
- Pat Knox, Lorraine Paich, Weston Wilson – backing vocals (lightning chant) (9)
- What So Not (10)
- James Rushent, Surahn Sidhu, Trevor Lukather – additional instrumentation (10)

=== Technical ===
- Produced by Toto (Steve Lukather, David Paich, Steve Porcaro, Joseph Williams)
- Supervising producer, audio editing – Joseph Williams
- Engineered by Greg Ladanyi, Niko Bolas, Al Schmitt, David Leonard, Tom Knox, Shep Lonsdale, Peggy McCreary (1981–1984)
- Engineered by Joseph Williams, Steve Porcaro, Niko Bolas, Shannon Forrest (2016–2017)
- Additional engineering – Damien Weatherley and James Rushent (10)
- Additional contribution – George Maple (10)
- Assistant editors & engineers – Pat Knox, Weston Wilson
- Pro Tools transfers – Mike Ging
- Mixed by Bob Clearmountain (1–9) and Cassian & What So Not (10)
- Digital audio editor, mix assistant – Sergio Ruelas
- Mastered by Bob Ludwig (1–9) and Dale Becker (10)

== Charts ==
Chart (2020)	Peak position
Swiss Albums (Schweizer Hitparade)	69
