= Without Your Love (Toto song) =

Single by Toto

from the album Fahrenheit
- B-side: "Can't Stand It Any Longer"
- Released: December 1986
- Recorded: 1985
- Genre: Soft rock; blue-eyed soul
- Length: 4:33
- Label: Columbia
- Songwriter: David Paich
- Producer: Toto

Toto singles chronology
"Till the End" (1986)	"Without Your Love" (1986)	"Lea" (1987)

"Without Your Love" is a single by the American rock band Toto, released in December 1986 as the third single from their sixth studio album, Fahrenheit. The song was written by David Paich and features lead vocals by Steve Lukather.

The single debuted at No.77 on the US Billboard Hot 100 for the week dated December 27, 1986. It was the third most added song to playlists from radio stations reporting to Billboard for the week dated January 10, 1987. The song later went on to peak at No. 38 in February 1987. "Without Your Love" was one of Toto's most successful adult contemporary hits of the 1980s and peaked at No. 7 on the Billboard Adult Contemporary chart in March 1987.

A music video was produced for the song, which was produced by Eric Wooster and directed by Tommy Chong.

== Critical reception ==
Billboard characterized the song as a "slow rhythmic rock ballad with [a] big spacious sound" that was "produced with a rumbling resonance that recalls 1982's smash, "Africa". Cashbox called the song a "soulful midtempo ballad" with "sterling production".

== Personnel ==
=== Toto ===
- Steve Lukather – lead and backing vocals, guitars
- Joseph Williams – backing vocals
- David Paich – keyboards, backing vocals
- Steve Porcaro – keyboards
- Mike Porcaro – bass guitar
- Jeff Porcaro – drums, percussion

=== Additional musicians ===
- Paulette Brown – backing vocals
- Tony Walthes – backing vocals
- "Sidney" – additional percussion

== Charts ==
Chart (1987)	Peak position
Canada Top Singles (RPM)	77
Canada Adult Contemporary (RPM)	7
Netherlands (Single Top 100)	64
US Billboard Hot 100	38
US Adult Contemporary (Billboard)	7
