= Turn Back (album) =

1981 album by Toto

Studio album by Toto
- Released: January 16, 1981
- Recorded: July – December 1980
- Studio: Cherokee Studios (Hollywood)
- Genres: Arena rock; hard rock
- Length: 37:43
- Label: Columbia
- Producers: Toto; Geoff Workman

Toto chronology
Hydra (1979)	Turn Back (1981)	Toto IV (1982)

Singles from Turn Back
- 1. "Goodbye Elenore" Released: February 13, 1981; 2. "If It's the Last Night" Released: April 2, 1981; 3. "Live for Today" Released: April 17, 1981 (Aus)

Turn Back is the third studio album by the American rock band Toto. It was released on January 16, 1981. Although it yielded the band's first top-ten hit in Japan and steady sales in that country, the album was a commercial disappointment elsewhere, failing to produce any charting singles and selling approximately 900,000 copies worldwide.

== Background ==
Turn Back was recorded with Geoff Workman, who worked as the engineer for Queen, as well as producer and engineer for the Cars, Journey, and Foreigner. The band's intention behind the album was to become an "arena rock band" and emphasize a heavier rock sound. Toto guitarist and vocalist Steve Lukather has credited Workman for providing the album a "new and very different sound" consisting of virtually no mid-range.

The album contained the band's first Japanese hit, "Goodbye Elenore", but the song failed to chart on the U.S. Billboard Hot 100, having instead reached No. 7 on the Bubbling Under chart. Turn Back is also noteworthy for containing the first Toto track written by Lukather, the rocker "Live for Today". Despite the band's confidence in the album, Turn Back was a commercial failure, making it no higher than 41 on Billboard's 200 chart. Lukather partially attributed the album's lack of success to the band's refusal to film videos using the recorded album tracks, instead opting for a live rendition of "Goodbye Elenore" which received no MTV airplay. The album was also not helped by what Lukather describes as "scathing reviews." Toto did not tour in support of Turn Back.

The commercial failure of Turn Back put Toto in a precarious position with Columbia Records, which threatened to terminate the band's contract if they did not produce a hit for their next album. The band would meet the challenge in 1982 with the hit album Toto IV.

In 2018, Turn Back was remastered by longtime Toto collaborator Elliot Scheiner from the original master tapes and re-released as part of Toto's All In career retrospective.

Lukather said in 2013 that it was the band's "fuck you record". He further said:

We wanted to prove we were an arena rock band. It’s probably the weirdest record we’ve done, certainly sonically, but we were really proud of it when it came out. It didn't really catch on -- over the years, it's sold, and now it's kind of a cult favorite with fans, but at the time it was kind of a stiff. And then we panicked -- we never even went on the road for that one. The record company was like, "Okay, guys. We let you do what you want to do. Are you gonna give us a hit record? Because if you don't, we’re gonna drop you."

== Reception ==
Professional ratings
Review scores
Source	Rating
AllMusic	3/5 stars

AllMusic writer William Ruhlmann wrote that the album had no memorable songs, but that it had "those famous chops that Toto possessed in abundance". Ruhlmann also thought that the album's title should have been Fall Back, because the bandmembers always had their studio jobs to fall back on. Lukather also recalls one reviewer noting that Turn Back was an appropriate album title because "that is what you should do when you buy this record."

== Track listing ==
Side one
No.	Title	Writer(s)	Lead vocals	Length
1.	"Gift with a Golden Gun"	David Paich, Bobby Kimball	Kimball	4:00
2.	"English Eyes"	Paich, Kimball, Jeff Porcaro, Steve Porcaro	Kimball	6:11
3.	"Live for Today"	Steve Lukather	Lukather	4:00
4.	"A Million Miles Away"	Paich	Kimball	4:26

Side two
No.	Title	Writer(s)	Lead vocals	Length
5.	"Goodbye Elenore"	Paich	Kimball, Lukather	4:52
6.	"I Think I Could Stand You Forever"	Paich	Lukather	5:25
7.	"Turn Back"	Kimball, Lukather	Kimball	3:58
8.	"If It's the Last Night"	Paich	Lukather	4:28

== Personnel ==
=== Toto ===
- Bobby Kimball – lead vocals (1, 2, 4, 5, 7), backing vocals
- Steve Lukather – guitars, lead vocals (3, 5, 6, 8), backing vocals
- David Paich – piano, keyboards, synthesizers, organ, backing vocals
- Steve Porcaro – keyboards, synthesizers, electronics
- David Hungate – bass, acoustic guitar (6)
- Jeff Porcaro – drums, percussion

==== Additional personnel ====
- Joe Porcaro – additional percussion (8)

=== Technical ===
- Produced by Toto and Geoff Workman
- Engineered and mixed by Geoff Workman
- Recorded by John Weaver
- Mastered by George Marino and Nestor Iencenella at Sterling Sound, New York
- Crew – Chris Littleton (road manager), Dick Gall (guitars), Bruce Heigh (keyboards), Paul Jamieson (drums), Guy Moore (live mixer), Leo Bonamy (production), and Shep Lonsdale (stage mixer)
- Technicians – Roger Linn and Ralph Dyck
- Photography – Sam Emerson and John Cosgrove
- Design – Tony Lane

== Charts ==
Chart (1981)	Peak position
Australian Albums (Kent Music Report)	89
Canada Top Albums/CDs (RPM)	29
German Albums (Offizielle Top 100)	39
Japanese Albums (Oricon)	3
Norwegian Albums (VG-lista)	4
Swedish Albums (Sverigetopplistan)	16
US Billboard 200	41
