= Stop Loving You =

Single by Toto

from the album The Seventh One
- B-side: "The Seventh One"
- Released: March 7, 1988
- Recorded: 1987
- Genre: Pop rock, arena rock
- Length: 4:30
- Label: Columbia
- Songwriters: David Paich, Steve Lukather
- Producers: Toto; George Massenburg; Bill Payne

Toto singles chronology
"Pamela" (1988)	"Stop Loving You" (1988)	"Straight for the Heart" (1988)

"Stop Loving You" is a song from the rock band Toto from their album The Seventh One. It was released as the first single from the album in Europe, peaking at No. 2 in The Netherlands and Belgium. The song was written by guitarist Steve Lukather and pianist David Paich. The Yes vocalist Jon Anderson is featured on backing vocals.

== Personnel ==
Toto

- Joseph Williams – lead vocals, backing vocals
- Steve Lukather – guitars, backing vocals
- David Paich – keyboards, backing vocals
- Mike Porcaro – bass
- Jeff Porcaro – drums, percussion

Additional musicians

- Michael Fisher – percussion
- Bill Payne – keyboards
- Steve Porcaro – synthesizers, programming
- Gary Herbig – alto saxophone
- Tom Scott – tenor saxophone, horn arrangements
- Gary Grant – trumpet
- Jerry Hey – trumpet
- Chuck Findley – trumpet
- James Pankow – trombone
- Jon Anderson – backing vocals

== Charts ==
=== Weekly charts ===
Chart (1988)	Peak position
Belgium (Ultratop 50 Flanders)	2
Netherlands (Single Top 100)	2
Europe (European Hot 100 Singles)	92
European Airplay Top 50 (Music & Media)	9
Norway (VG-lista)	9
UK Singles (OCC)	96

=== Year-end charts ===
Chart (1988)	Peak position
Belgian VRT Top 30	19
Dutch Top 40	6
Netherlands (Single Top 100)	7

== Live versions ==
With original lead vocalist Joseph Williams having left the group not long after the song's recording, lead vocal duties on the song were passed on to Tony Spinner in 2002. For their live album, Falling in Between Live and final concerts, Toto performed a semi jazz version of the song.

Since Williams's return in 2010, "Stop Loving You" has since appeared on 35th Anniversary Tour and 40 Trips Around the Sun, two live albums released in 2014 and 2018 respectively.
