= Fahrenheit (Toto album) =

Studio album by Toto
- Released: August 20, 1986
- Recorded: 1985–1986
- Studios: The Villa (Los Angeles); The Manor (Los Angeles); Schnee Studios (Hollywood); Record One (Los Angeles); The Complex (Los Angeles)
- Genres: Pop rock; soft rock; R&B
- Length: 43:57
- Label: Columbia
- Producer: Toto

Toto chronology
Dune (1984)	Fahrenheit (1986)	The Seventh One (1988)

Singles from Fahrenheit
- 1. "I'll Be Over You" Released: August 1986; 2. "Till the End b/w Don't Stop Me Now" Released: November 1986 (Japan) (Note: released in the US in March 1987); 3. "Without Your Love" Released: December 1986; 4. "Lea b/w Don't Stop Me Now" Released: 1987 (NL)

Fahrenheit is the sixth studio album by American rock band Toto, released on August 20, 1986, by Columbia Records. It was the first album to feature Joseph Williams on lead vocals, after Fergie Frederiksen, the band's previous vocalist, was fired following the culmination of the Isolation tour. Additionally, it was the last album to include keyboardist Steve Porcaro as a permanent member (until Toto XIV).

It features the Billboard Hot 100 hit singles "I'll Be Over You" (No. 11) and "Without Your Love" (No. 38).

== Overview ==
During the initial Fahrenheit sessions, lead singer Fergie Frederiksen, who worked with Toto on Isolation, was fired due to difficulties with his performance in the studio. Joseph Williams was recommended as his replacement by Jason Scheff and passed the audition. He had known the other members since they were teenagers, and his father, famous composer John Williams, had worked with the Porcaros' father Joe and David Paich's father Marty. Frederiksen's backing vocals were kept for "Could This Be Love".

Williams joined Toto half-way through the album's recording sessions, by which point the group had already recorded most of the music and had been working on it for around eight months. Since most of the melodies were still incomplete, he was able to make his own contributions, as evidenced by his five co-writing credits on the album.

The instrumental introduction for the album's title track was composed by British-Canadian musician Amin Bhatia, whom band member Steve Porcaro met in May 1985 after Toto's show in Calgary, Alberta.

The lead single "I'll Be Over You", written by band member Steve Lukather with Randy Goodrum, peaked at No. 11 on the US Billboard Hot 100 chat, and featured Michael McDonald on backing vocals. Its music video, which also included McDonald, was filmed on a rooftop in Los Angeles, California, and directed by Nick Morris. Meanwhile, the video for the David Paich and Joseph Williams penned single, "Till The End", saw the directorial debut of drummer Jeff Porcaro and included an appearance by singer and dancer Paula Abdul.

Fahrenheit was the last Toto album to include keyboardist Steve Porcaro as a permanent member until 2015's Toto XIV. He left at the end of the album's supporting tour, citing feelings of being sidelined and a desire to focus on his own music. Despite his eventual departure, the album featured "Lea", a song written by Porcaro that featured saxophonist David Sanborn and backing vocals by Don Henley. It was his first songwriting contribution since "It's a Feeling" from Toto IV (1982).

Jazz trumpeter Miles Davis was featured on the album's closing instrumental track, "Don't Stop Me Now", alongside Sanborn. David Paich and Steve Lukather played the track for Davis while at Jeff Porcaro's home studio. Davis expressed interest and offered to perform on it for free.

Fahrenheit was certified gold by the Recording Industry Association of America on 3 October 1994.

== Critical reception ==
Professional ratings
Review scores
Source	Rating
AllMusic	2/5 stars
Kerrang!	4.5/5 stars
Windsor Star	B

AllMusic's William Ruhlmann described Toto's work on Fahrenheit as "lush, mid-tempo tunes of romantic despair," and explained that the band's career was in trouble at the time, as the radio audience was "failing to identify the songs with the group that made them." Nick DeRiso from SomethingElse! expressed disappointment that an album of "varied musical goals and textures was reduced to its singles." Both reviewers pointed out that Joseph Williams brought a grittier vocal style compared to Toto's previous vocalists.

Lang Sem Fatt of the New Straits Times said on 21 September 1986 that Fahrenheit was the kind of album that only Toto would make, offering "a bit of everything for everybody" with a "fashionable rock touch," but still remaining "purely commercial." Earlier that same month, music director Gerry O'Shea wrote in The Sydney Morning Herald that the album was a departure from the band's usual "up-tempo high-sheen rock to a more refelective [sic] and down-beat mode." Shortly after, Ted Shaw of Windsor Star gave the album a B rating, stating that "while nothing Toto records [sic] can be deemed thoughtful or original," it was still a "decent effort." Jerry Spangler of Deseret News believed that Toto had forgotten that their "real strength was melody and vocal harmony," both of which he felt were lacking in Fahrenheit.

At the end of August, Cashbox described the basis of William's introduction in Fahrenheit as "intricate and commercial arrangements of hooky songs." The "tender and forlorn" first single, "I'll Be Over You", was predicted to make a strong showing as a "wistful and emotional song." Billboard wrote a few days later that with the album, Toto returned with a "formidable set of pop/light-rock tunes," describing the musicianship as "faultless" and affirming that the group benefited from the addition of Williams.

== Track listing ==
Side one
No.	Title	Writer(s)	Length
1.	"Till the End"	David Paich; Joseph Williams	5:28
2.	"We Can Make It Tonight"	Williams; Jeff Porcaro; Barry Bregman	4:17
3.	"Without Your Love"	Paich	4:33
4.	"Can't Stand It Any Longer"	Paich; Lukather; Williams	4:39
5.	"I'll Be Over You"	Lukather; Randy Goodrum	3:55

Side two
No.	Title	Writer(s)	Length
6.	"Fahrenheit"	Paich; J. Porcaro; Williams	4:40
7.	"Somewhere Tonight"	J. Porcaro; Paich; Lukather	3:45
8.	"Could This Be Love"	Paich; Williams	5:13
9.	"Lea"	Steve Porcaro	4:31
10.	"Don't Stop Me Now" (instrumental)	Lukather; Paich	3:09
Total length:			44:10

== Personnel ==
Adapted from the album's liner notes.

=== Toto ===
- Joseph Williams – lead vocals (1, 2, 4, 6–9), backing vocals
- Steve Lukather – guitars, lead vocals (3, 5), backing vocals
- David Paich – piano, keyboards, synthesizers, backing vocals
- Steve Porcaro – keyboards, synthesizers, electronics
- Mike Porcaro – bass
- Jeff Porcaro – drums, percussion

==== Additional musicians ====
- Michael Sherwood – backing vocals (1, 9)
- Paulette Brown – backing vocals (3)
- Tony Walthes – backing vocals (3)
- Mike McDonald – backing vocals (5)
- Fergie Frederiksen – backing vocals (8)
- Don Henley – backing vocals (9)
- Amin Bhatia – synthesizer intro (6)
- Miles Davis – trumpet (10)
- Lenny Castro – percussion (1, 2, 4, 5, 7–9)
- Paulinho da Costa – percussion (1, 5, 7)
- "Sidney" – percussion (3, 6)
- Joe Porcaro – percussion (7, 10)
- Jim Keltner – percussion (9)
- Steve Jordan – percussion (9)
- Charlie Loper – saxophone (1)
- Jerry Hey – trumpet, horn arrangements (1, 6)
- Chuck Findley – trumpet (1, 6)
- Gary Grant – trumpet (1, 6)
- Bill Reichenbach – trombone (1)
- David Sanborn – saxophone (6, 9, 10)
- Tom Scott – saxophone (6)
- Larry Williams – saxophone (6)

=== Technical ===
- Produced and arranged by Toto
- Mixed by Greg Ladanyi (1–9) and Tom Knox (10)
- Engineered by Tom Knox, Shep Lonsdale, and Greg Ladanyi
- Additional engineers – Jack Puig, Julie Last, Doug Linnell, John Jessel, Murray Dvorkin, Duane Seykora, Dan Garcia, Mike Ross, and Teruo "Mu" Murakami
- Mastered by Bob Ludwig at Masterdisk, New York
- Technicians – Keith Albright (piano), Brent Averill, Bob Bradshaw (guitars), Paul Jamieson (drums), John Jessel, Art Kelm, Roger Linn (synthesizers), Roger Nichols, Eli Slawson
- Production coordinator and band mobilizer – Chris Littleton
- Art direction – Tony Lane and Nancy Donald
- Sleeve photography – Jim Shea
- Photography – Michael Going
- Management – Larry Fitzgerald & Mark Hartley

== Charts ==
=== Weekly charts ===
Chart	Peak position
Australian Kent Music Report	98
Canadian RPM Albums Chart	44
Dutch Mega Albums Chart	27
Finnish Albums Chart	7
Japanese Oricon LP Chart	3
Norwegian VG-lista Albums Chart	8
Swedish Albums Chart	6
Swiss Albums Chart	24
UK Albums Chart	99
U.S. Billboard 200	40
West German Media Control Albums Chart	24

=== Certifications ===
Region	Certification
United States (RIAA)	Gold
