= Pamela (song) =

Single by Toto

from the album The Seventh One
- B-side: "The Seventh One" (US); "You Got Me" (EU/Japan); "Stay Away" (UK)
- Released: February 1988 (US); May 1988 (UK)
- Genre: Pop rock; arena rock
- Length: 5:11 (album); 4:28 (single)
- Label: Columbia
- Songwriters: David Paich; Joseph Williams
- Producers: Toto; George Massenburg; Bill Payne

Toto singles chronology
"Lea" (1987)	"Pamela" (1988)	"Stop Loving You" (1988)

"Pamela" is a song written by David Paich and Joseph Williams and performed by American rock band Toto for their 1988 album The Seventh One. It was the first US single from the album, peaking at No. 22 on the Billboard Hot 100, becoming their final Billboard Hot 100 hit to date. It also reached No. 9 on the Adult Contemporary chart. It is also the penultimate track by Toto to chart on the Adult contemporary chart until "Anna" was released.

In Europe, "Pamela" was the second single, as "Stop Loving You" was selected as the lead single from the album instead.

== Background ==
The song was written by David Paich and Joseph Williams. Paich had first written the chorus, music and words, including the name, "Pamela". Williams happened to be dating a woman at the time named "Pamela", and had already written a song for her by the same name. The chorus of Williams's song was used in the bridge, and Williams wrote new words and melody for the verses as well.

In the United States, "Pamela" was the first single released from The Seventh One. According to Steve Lukather, the band's guitarist, the single had received considerable support from Al Teller, who at the time was the head of Columbia Records. Roughly a week after Teller had met with the band to celebrate the commercial success of The Seventh One, Teller had left Columbia Records. Lukather believed that Teller's departure from the label deprived the single of additional support, thus preventing it from ascending further up the charts.

== Critical reception ==
Cashbox called "Pamela" "a beautifully conceived tune, replete with the wonderful production ideas that the band is famous for." Billboard believed that "Pamela" was "better than anything on the last album". Music & Media called the song a "funky semi-ballad that will undoubtedly do well."

== Personnel ==
Toto

- Joseph Williams – lead vocals, backing vocals
- Steve Lukather – guitars, backing vocals
- David Paich – keyboards, piano, backing vocals
- Mike Porcaro – bass
- Jeff Porcaro – drums, tambourine

Additional musicians

- Joe Porcaro – vibraphone
- Steve Porcaro – synthesizers
- Gary Herbig – alto saxophone
- Tom Scott – tenor saxophone, horn arrangements
- Jim Horn – baritone saxophone
- Jerry Hey – trumpet
- Gary Grant – trumpet
- Chuck Findley – trumpet
- James Pankow – trombone
- Tom Kelly – backing vocals

== Charts ==
=== Weekly charts ===
Chart (1988)	Peak position
Belgium (Ultratop 50 Flanders)	10
Netherlands (Dutch Top 40)	9
Netherlands (Single Top 100)	8
US Billboard Hot 100	22
US Adult Contemporary (Billboard)	9

=== Year-end charts ===
Chart (1988)	Position
Netherlands (Dutch Top 40)	94
Netherlands (Single Top 100)	62
