= Toto (band) =

American rock band

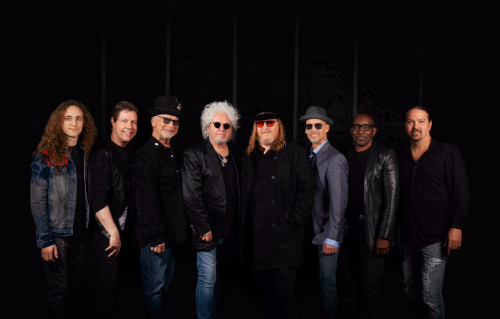
- Promotional image of Toto in 2024. From left to right: Dennis Atlas, Warren Ham, David Paich, Steve Lukather, Joseph Williams, John Pierce, Greg Phillinganes, Shannon Forrest

Background information
- Origin: Van Nuys, Los Angeles, California, U.S.
- Genres: Arena rock; pop rock; hard rock; jazz fusion; progressive rock
- Works: Discography
- Years active: 1977–2008; 2010–2019; 2020–present
- Labels: Columbia; Frontiers; Atlantic; Legacy; Sony; Mascot
- Spinoffs: Los Lobotomys
- Members: David Paich; Steve Lukather; Joseph Williams
- Past members: Jeff Porcaro; David Hungate; Bobby Kimball; Steve Porcaro; Mike Porcaro; Fergie Frederiksen; Jean-Michel Byron; Simon Phillips; Greg Phillinganes; Keith Carlock
- Website: totoofficial.com

Toto is an American rock band formed in Los Angeles, California, in 1977. Toto combines elements of pop, rock, soul, funk, prog, hard rock, R&B, blues, and jazz. Having released 14 studio albums and sold over 50 million records worldwide, the group has received several Grammy Awards and was inducted into the Musicians Hall of Fame and Museum in 2009.

David Paich (keyboards, vocals), Jeff Porcaro (drums), and David Hungate (bass) had played together as session musicians on several albums and formed the band; Steve Lukather (guitar, vocals), Steve Porcaro (keyboards), and Bobby Kimball (vocals) were recruited before the release of the band's eponymous debut album in 1978. Led by the top 5 single "Hold the Line", the album brought the band to mainstream attention, though it was their fourth album Toto IV (1982) which brought them global attention. "Africa" topped the Billboard Hot 100, while "Rosanna" reached number 2, helping Toto become one of the best-selling music groups of their era.

Before the release of Toto IV, Hungate left the band. He was replaced on bass by Mike Porcaro for their 1982 World Tour. During the recording of their next studio album, Isolation, Kimball also departed the band. He was replaced by a number of different short-term vocalists, the first of which was Fergie Frederiksen, and the longest serving of which was Joseph Williams. After Jeff Porcaro's death in 1992, he was replaced by Simon Phillips. While the band has not repeated the U.S. radio successes of their heyday in the late 1970s and early 1980s, they have continued to produce albums and tour more-or-less continuously to the current day, minus a few hiatuses, and have had many more top-ten albums and singles in places like Japan and Scandinavia. Steve Lukather remains the only original member who still records and tours with the band. Paich remains an official member of the band, though he has mostly retired from touring. Since the 2010s, the band has increasingly relied on contracted touring musicians to continue to perform. As of 2023, they have released fourteen studio albums, eight live albums, one movie soundtrack (1984's Dune) and a number of compilation albums. Their final release was 2018's Old Is New before the band decided against recording any further studio albums. In 2022, Toto launched its "Dogz of Oz" Tour by opening for Journey. Its first date was in Pittsburgh, Pennsylvania on February 22.

== History ==
=== 1977–1979: Formation and debut album ===
The members of Toto were regulars on albums by Sonny & Cher, Seals & Crofts, Steely Dan, Boz Scaggs, and many others, contributing to many of the most popular records of the 1970s. Keyboardist David Paich, son of musician and session player/arranger Marty Paich, rose to fame after having co-written much of Scaggs's Silk Degrees album. David met drummer Jeff Porcaro, the son of session percussionist Joe Porcaro, while attending Grant High School, where they formed the band Rural Still Life. Years later, having played on many sessions together, the two began to seriously discuss the possibility of forming their own band.

They brought in bassist and fellow session veteran David Hungate, with whom they had played in the backing bands for both Sonny & Cher and Scaggs. The duo asked fellow Grant High School students, guitarist Steve Lukather (who also played in Scaggs' band) and Jeff Porcaro's brother Steve Porcaro (keyboards) to join the team. Lukather and Steve Porcaro were in the same year at Grant and continued the band Rural Still Life (the name shortened to Still Life) after Paich and Jeff graduated. With the addition of former S.S. Fools singer Bobby Kimball, the group began to work on their first album in 1977 after signing with Columbia Records.

Once the band came together, David Paich began composing what would become the eponymous debut album, Toto. According to popular myth, at the first recording sessions, in order to distinguish their own demo tapes from other bands' in the studio, Jeff Porcaro wrote the word "Toto" on them. In the early 1980s, band members told the press that the band was named after Toto the dog from The Wizard of Oz. After the completion of the first album, the band and record were still unnamed. David Hungate, after viewing the name on the demo tapes, explained to the group that the Latin words "in toto" translated to "all-encompassing". Because the band members played on so many records and so many musical genres, they adopted the name "Toto" as their own.

Released in October 1978, Toto climbed the charts quickly, earning popularity with the hit single "Hold the Line", as well as the charting "I'll Supply the Love" and "Georgy Porgy", featuring Cheryl Lynn. Though the band was largely dismissed by music critics, they were nominated for a Grammy Award for Best New Artist. Shortly thereafter, in early 1979, Toto embarked on their first American tour in support of the debut album. For the tour, Toto brought along two additional musicians, Tom Kelly (guitar & backing vocals) and Lenny Castro (percussion & backing vocals), to increase the depth of the sound. Castro had appeared with the group on their first album as a session musician and continued to play on every one of their albums for the next 40 years in varying capacities, with the exception of Turn Back. The band continued to hire additional touring musicians for all subsequent tours. (See the "Tour Musicians" section below.)

=== 1979–1981: Hydra and Turn Back ===
At the close of the first tour, the band began work on their next album, Hydra, which was released later that year and featured the single "99", inspired by George Lucas' cult film THX 1138. Nearly 30 years later, Steve Lukather confessed that, despite the song's popularity, he hated "99" and that it's one of his least favorite Toto songs. The band also released four promotional music videos for the album, including the title track, "99", "St George and The Dragon" and "All Us Boys". They were directed by Bruce Gowers and produced by Paul Flattery for Jon Roseman Productions International. Although the album Hydra failed to achieve the commercial success of Toto's first release, it still went gold. Following the album's release, the band set out on the "Hydra Tour", which featured both American and international dates. The tour lasted from January until June 1980.

In early 1981, Toto released their third album, Turn Back. The album was a venture into arena rock and featured heavier guitar and fewer keyboards than the previous two albums. Its disappointing chart performance and sales in almost every country except Japan and Norway put the band's career into further jeopardy, as they had not had a hit single in North America in almost two years at that point. The unexpected success of the album's lead single "Goodbye Elenore" in Japan proved to be the band's breakthrough there, and Japan has become a permanent staple of their touring schedule since.

=== 1982–1985: Toto IV and Isolation ===
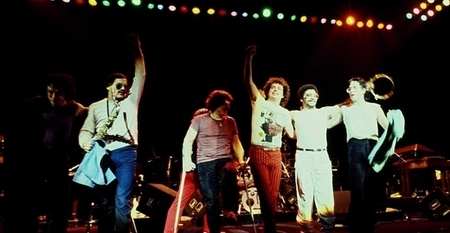
Toto performing at the Hammersmith Odeon in London in 1982. (L–R: Steve Porcaro, Jon Smith, Bobby Kimball, Steve Lukather, Lenny Castro, Jeff Porcaro)

Africa

1982 marked the beginning of Toto's most successful era. After the poor sales of Turn Back, the band was under a great deal of pressure from the record company to produce a new hit record, akin to their first. With the Triple Platinum-certified Toto IV, the band delivered one of the most commercially successful records of the year. The album featured three singles that reached the Top 10 on the Billboard Hot 100 chart: "Rosanna", "Africa" and "I Won't Hold You Back". The album appeared on several worldwide charts, introducing the band to new audiences around the globe. "Africa" topped the charts in February 1983 and was a constant presence on radios around the world, but it was "Rosanna" that earned the band multiple Grammy nominations. Toto IV earned six Grammy Awards, including "Record of the Year" for "Rosanna", "Album of the Year" for Toto IV and "Producer of the Year". At the time Steve Porcaro was dating actress Rosanna Arquette, but the song is not about her, according to writer David Paich.

In the music video for the song, Cynthia Rhodes plays the title character. In addition to "Africa" and "Rosanna", Toto IV continued its successful run with the release of another single, "Make Believe". Toto toured throughout 1982 in support of Toto IV. During this time, Steve Porcaro co-wrote and co-composed "Human Nature", which Michael Jackson recorded for his best-selling album Thriller (1982), turning the song into a smash hit. Jeff Porcaro and Steve Lukather also appeared on Thriller on multiple tracks, most notably on "Beat It" and the Jackson/Paul McCartney duet "The Girl Is Mine".

Directly after the release of Toto IV, bassist David Hungate left the band. Hungate, who had relocated to Nashville in 1980 to pursue a session/production career, felt that the fame surrounding Toto IV would prevent him from spending time with his family. A third Porcaro brother, Mike Porcaro, who had performed cello on a track from Toto IV, replaced Hungate on bass, while lead singer Bobby Kimball spent the early part of 1983 facing prosecution for drug-related charges. Kimball was ordered to stand trial, but pled not guilty. The charges were dismissed on May 28 of that year. However, Kimball was fired from the band in 1984 due to difficulty recording vocals and numerous missed sessions. Later that year, Toto composed most of the music for the soundtrack to the film Dune.

At one point, Richard Page of the band Mr. Mister was offered the lead singer spot, but turned it down to continue with his band. Fergie Frederiksen (formerly of bands Angel, Trillion and LeRoux) was brought in as the new vocalist and the band recorded Isolation, released in November 1984. While Isolation did not achieve the acclaim or sales of Toto IV, it did achieve Gold status, largely on the strength of the single "Stranger in Town". Isolation's tour began in February 1985 and concluded three months later.

=== 1985–1988: Fahrenheit and The Seventh One with Joseph Williams ===
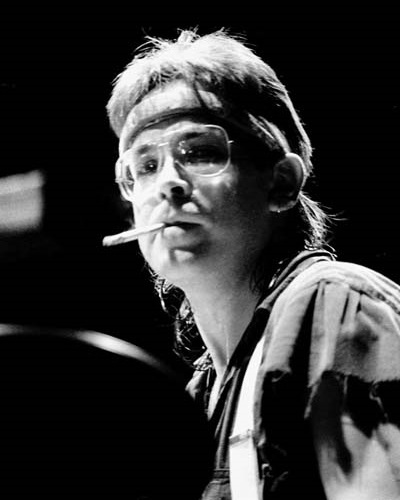
Original drummer Jeff Porcaro performing with the band in 1986

At the close of the Isolation tour in 1985, Fergie Frederiksen was let go. Lukather stated that the band was not meshing well with Frederiksen because he had a difficult time recording with them in the studio. The band held an audition and Joseph Williams, son of film composer John Williams and 1950s singer/actress Barbara Ruick, was chosen to take over lead vocals in early 1986.

With Joseph Williams now onboard officially, Toto wrote and recorded Fahrenheit, released in August 1986. While Williams performs lead vocals, Frederiksen had begun recording a few tracks before leaving the band, and he is featured as a background vocalist on the track "Could This Be Love".

Fahrenheit brought the band back from the heavier sound of Isolation to their pop/rock roots. "I'll Be Over You" and "Without Your Love", which were both ballads sung by Lukather, were the two hit singles. The band recruited several guest musicians for the album. They recorded an instrumental piece entitled "Don't Stop Me Now" with legendary jazz trumpeter Miles Davis. In addition, a then-unknown Paula Abdul appeared as a dancer in their "Till the End" music video. Michael McDonald provided backing vocals on the song "I'll Be Over You" (and appeared in the accompanying music video), while Eagles founder and songwriting giant Don Henley appeared on the Steve Porcaro penned track "Lea".

After the release of Fahrenheit, the band embarked on another world tour. Upon its conclusion in 1987, Steve Porcaro left the band to pursue a career in film and television scoring. Fahrenheit eventually went Gold on October 3, 1994. Steve Porcaro was never replaced and Toto decided to continue with only five members. Although Porcaro occasionally assisted the band on synthesizers for their subsequent studio albums and appeared on their 1988 tour, David Paich handled most of the live keyboard work, with keyboard technician John Jessel assisting from 1990 onward.

In 1988, Toto released their next album, The Seventh One. Jon Anderson of Yes featured on backing vocals on the single "Stop Loving You". The album's other single, "Pamela", became very popular and would be the band's last to hit the US Top 40. The Seventh One became the band's most successful release since Toto IV. The band toured from February through July 1988.

=== 1988–1990: Hiatus, Past to Present and Jean-Michel Byron ===
Although "The Seventh One Tour" was very successful worldwide, the band decided that they had to replace lead singer Joseph Williams, whose performance was affected by weak vocals on various dates throughout the tour. The band then entered a hiatus for almost 2 years. During this time, Lukather embarked on his first solo tour of small clubs around the west coast in November 1988. He then released his first solo album, Lukather, in 1989. It featured musicians such as Eddie Van Halen and Richard Marx. In August 1989, he toured Japan with Chuck Berry, Jeff Beck, and Bad English.

When the time came for Toto to resume work, their record company suggested that they released a greatest hits record which would include new material. The band initially wanted to reunite with original vocalist Bobby Kimball to record new songs for the album, but the record company instead insisted they hire South African singer Jean-Michel Byron. Before Byron was brought in, the band recorded the song "Goin' Home" with Kimball, which was later released in 1998 on their Toto XX album. In 1989, Byron and Toto recorded four new songs which were included on their greatest hits album Past to Present 1977–1990, released in 1990.

The band then embarked on their "Planet Earth" tour that lasted from September until December 1990. The band didn't get along with Byron, whose diva-like behavior and flamboyant stage presence caused friction during the tour. He was demoted to background vocals before ultimately being fired at the conclusion of the tour. During this time, the band also found that former singer Bobby Kimball was booking shows and billing himself and his backing band as "Toto". In April 1991, mirroring the situation that had happened with Kimball seven years prior, former singer Joseph Williams was arrested on drug-related charges.

=== 1991–1992: Kingdom of Desire and Jeff Porcaro's death ===
With Toto once again without a frontman, guitarist Steve Lukather stepped in as lead vocalist, until Bobby Kimball's return in 1998. However, some older material not fully suited for Lukather's voice was sung by backing singers Jenny Douglas-Foote (who joined in 1990), Jacci McGee (who joined in 1990 and was replaced by Donna McDaniel in 1992), and Fred White (who joined in 1991 and was replaced by John James in 1992). The band began working on their next album in February 1991. The band then embarked on a European festival tour that summer, which included a performance at the Montreux Jazz Festival, which was released on Blu-ray and CD in 2016 as Live at Montreux 1991. The band continued work on the album throughout the next year.

Jeff Porcaro died unexpectedly on August 5, 1992, at the age of 38 while working in his garden. According to the Los Angeles Times Report, the Los Angeles County Coroner's office lists the cause of death to be a heart attack from the hardening of the arteries caused by cocaine use. Facing the prospect of a tour without Jeff, Toto almost broke up. However, Jeff Porcaro's family insisted the band continue. The band contacted Los Angeles-based Englishman Simon Phillips to fill the slot, as they knew that Porcaro liked Phillips' playing. Lukather also had performed with Phillips with Santana and Jeff Beck in Japan in 1986.

Kingdom of Desire, posthumously featuring Jeff Porcaro, was released on Columbia Records in most parts of the world on September 7, 1992. It was released on Relativity Records in the United States on May 11, 1993. With Phillips now in the band, they embarked on their world tour, which they dedicated to Jeff's memory. At the conclusion of the tour in 1993, and following the release of the live album Absolutely Live, the band went on another hiatus to pursue individual projects.

On December 14, 1992, the band held the Tribute to Jeff Porcaro concert at Los Angeles' Universal Amphitheatre. The concert's proceeds went to Porcaro's family. Performers including Michael McDonald, David Crosby, Boz Scaggs, Donald Fagen, Denny Dias, Don Henley, Eddie Van Halen, and special guest George Harrison performed various of their own hits and Toto songs. Former Toto members Steve Porcaro, Lenny Castro, Paulette Brown, and James Newton Howard were also present.

From March to November 1993, Lukather recorded the album Candyman with Phillips on drums, David Garfield on keyboards, and John Peña on bass. It was released as both a Lukather solo album and a Los Lobotomys album in different parts of the world. They then embarked on a tour throughout 1994.

=== 1995–1997: Addition of Simon Phillips and Tambu ===
In 1995, Toto resumed work and recorded Tambu, which saw the band back with CBS (now Sony). It was their first album with Phillips on drums, and was a departure from Toto's sound of the 1970s and 1980s. It featured the single "I Will Remember," which received moderate radio play. The other singles released were "Drag Him to the Roof" and "The Turning Point". Tambu also included touring vocalists Jenny Douglas-Foote and John James, with Douglas-Foote singing lead vocals on a bonus track, "Blackeye," and a duet with Lukather on "Baby He's Your Man". Tambu sold 600,000 copies worldwide.

The Tambu tour proved to be another success, although there were no North American dates. In November and December, Phillips temporarily left the tour due to medical issues, so Gregg Bissonette filled in for him. Douglas-Foote also took a maternity leave in early 1996, so singer Sofia Bender filled in for her. The tour concluded in July 1996, which included the band opening for Tina Turner in England that same month.

In 1997, Lukather released his second solo album, Luke, and embarked on a European solo tour. Toto also performed in South Africa for the first time in November of that same year.

=== 1997–2001: Toto XX, Bobby Kimball's return and Mindfields ===
1997 marked the band's 20th anniversary, and in order to commemorate it, David Paich and Steve Lukather started to go through several old tapes and demos for a special record of unreleased songs. They then recorded overdubs and mixed other songs for release. In 1998, they released Toto XX with the lead single "Goin' Home". Toto went on a small promotional tour with former members Bobby Kimball, Steve Porcaro and Joseph Williams.

After the "Toto XX" tour, Bobby Kimball rejoined the band as lead singer after 14 years. The band released Mindfields in early 1999 and embarked on the "Reunion" tour, touring worldwide and returning to the United States for the first time in six years. The new album featured three singles, "Melanie", "Cruel" and "Mad About You", a song co-written by David Paich and former vocalist Joseph Williams. Later that year, a live album titled Livefields was released. The tour officially concluded in 2000, but the band played a few shows throughout 2001. David Paich briefly took a break from touring in 2000, so Jeff Babko filled in on keyboards. Paich then resumed touring with Toto in 2001.

=== 2002–2003: Through the Looking Glass and Toto's 25th anniversary ===
In 2002, in celebration of Toto's 25th anniversary, the band released Through the Looking Glass, a covers album that paid tribute to the band's musical influences, such as Bob Marley, Steely Dan, The Beatles, and Elton John. Two singles were released: "Could You Be Loved", a Bob Marley cover, and "While My Guitar Gently Weeps", a Beatles cover. The album was not a commercial success and many fans were upset about the release, thinking that the band should have written new material instead. However, the record gave the band material to promote their "25th Anniversary Tour", which started in 2002 and concluded in 2003. After the tour, Toto released a live album and DVD of the show titled Live in Amsterdam. Both the live album and the DVD were released in late 2003.

=== 2003–2005: Greg Phillinganes joins and David Paich's semi-retirement ===
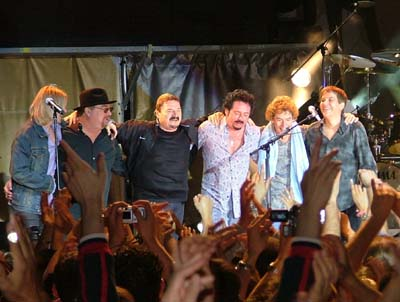
Toto on stage at the Summer Tour 2004 in Modena, Italy, July 11, 2004. From the left: Tony Spinner, David Paich, Bobby Kimball, Steve Lukather, Simon Phillips, Mike Porcaro

Beginning in June 2003, near the end of their "25th Anniversary Tour", keyboardist David Paich took a leave of absence from touring to spend time with a sick family member. Veteran keyboardist Greg Phillinganes filled in for Paich for the rest of the tour.

In late 2003, Toto headlined Night of the Proms for two months straight. Paich returned but was only able to play for a few weeks before he had to leave again, so Phillinganes once again filled in for the remainder of the shows. After Simon Phillips announced he would be unable to play due to illness, Jon Fariss and Ricky Lawson joined the band for the Night of the Proms. In early 2004, the band embarked on a world tour that went throughout 2004 and 2005. Paich only occasionally appeared, with Phillinganes playing at most of the shows. In 2005, Phillinganes was asked to become a regular member of the band and Paich retired from touring. Paich was still a member of Toto, as he continued to record and produce on all of Toto's releases.

In October 2003, Steve Lukather released a Christmas album named Santamental, featuring musicians such as Eddie Van Halen, Slash, Steve Vai, and Gregg Bissonette.

=== 2006–2008: Falling in Between and the subsequent tour and live album ===
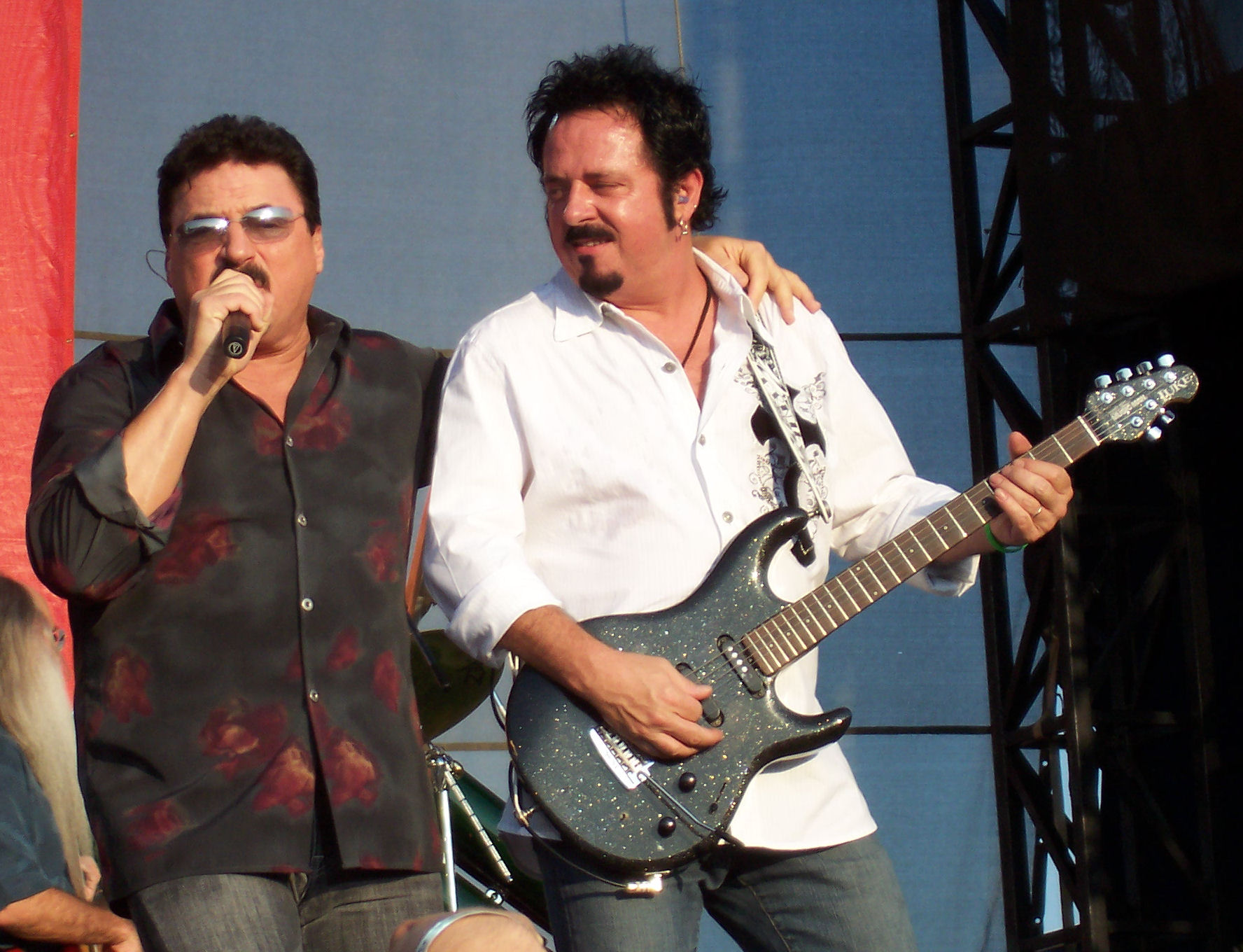
Kimball and Lukather performing with the band in 2007

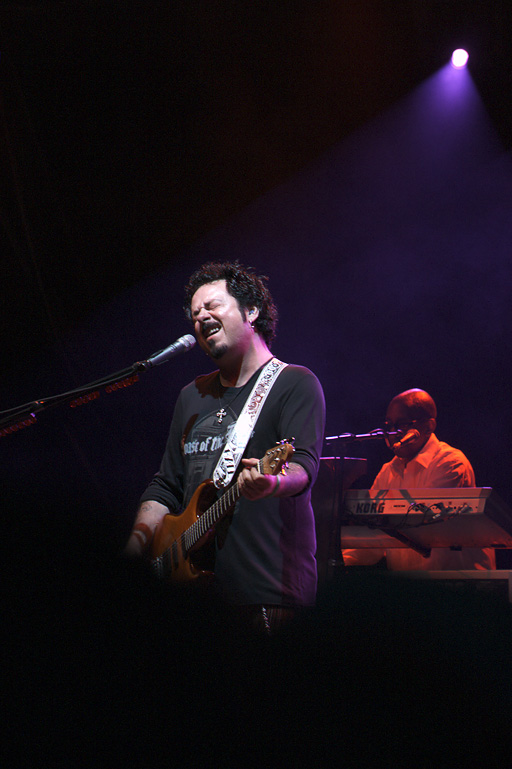
Lukather and Greg Phillinganes, in Trondheim, Norway, August 4, 2007

In early 2006, Toto released Falling in Between on the Italian label Frontiers, their first album of new material since 1999. The release featured extensive keyboard work from Steve Porcaro and a duet with Joseph Williams on the first single, "Bottom of Your Soul". Following the record's release, Toto embarked on a worldwide tour in 2006, which continued into 2007 for a second leg. The 2007 leg featured Leland Sklar filling in on bass for Mike Porcaro due to an, at the time, undisclosed illness. Mike Porcaro's last show with the band was on November 16, 2006, in Medina, Minnesota.

The 2007 leg featured extensive dates in both Europe and the United States, including an appearance at Moondance Jam in Walker, Minnesota. Former lead singer Fergie Frederiksen made a guest appearance at the Minneapolis date on May 5, 2007 and Joseph Williams also made a few guest appearances with the band in June 2007. The tour continued into 2008 and began in Mexico City, Mexico on January 31, 2008. They toured Japan with Boz Scaggs, which tour featured Joseph Williams singing lead and background vocals with Kimball, and featured the return of David Paich.

Toto released a two-CD set Falling in Between Live on Eagle Records to commemorate the tour. This live set marked the fourth for the band, following 1993's Absolutely Live, 1999's Livefields, and 2003's Live In Amsterdam.

In 2008, a companion DVD of the show, recorded at Le Zenith in Paris on March 26, 2007, was released.

=== 2008-2010: First hiatus and subsequent reformation ===
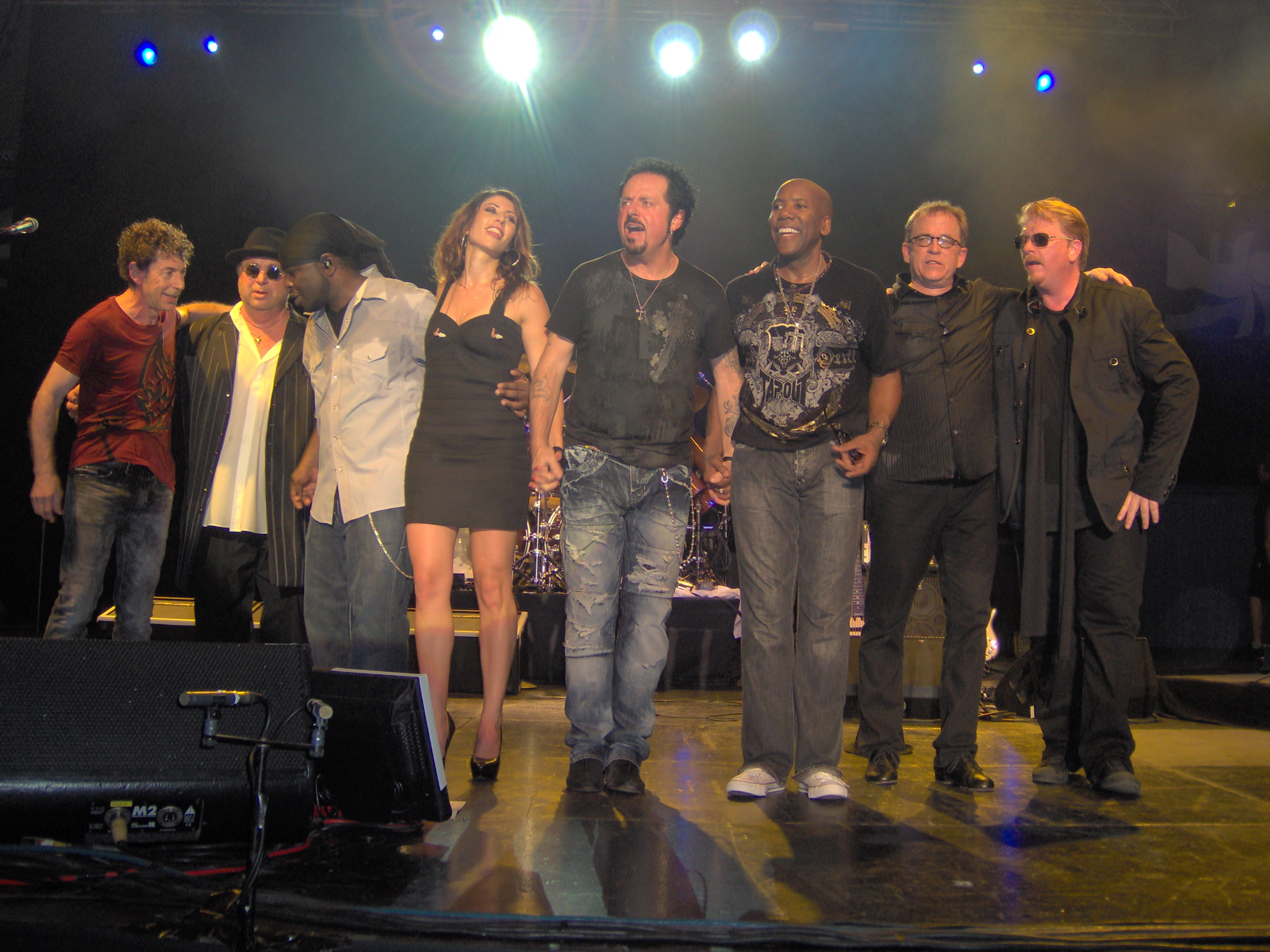
Toto live in Copenhagen, Denmark, at K.B. Hallen July 2010. From left: Simon Phillips, David Paich, Mabvuto Carpenter, Jory Steinberg, Steve Lukather, Nathan East, Steve Porcaro, Joseph Williams

On June 5, 2008, after a period of rumors about the band's future, Lukather posted a message on his official website, stating, "The fact is yes I have left Toto. There is no more Toto. I just can't do it anymore and at 50 years old I wanted to start over and give it one last try on my own."

As the main motivation for his decision, Lukather said:

When Dave [Paich] retired that was REAL hard for me 'cause we started the band together. Hell, it's 35 years if you count High School where the core all met. When Mike [Porcaro] fell ill and had to leave that was it for me. If there isn't Paich or at least one Porcaro how can we even call it Toto? ... Honestly, I have just had enough. This is NOT a break. It is over. I really can't go out and play Hold The Line with a straight face anymore.

Steve Lukather released his next solo album on February 22, 2008, titled Ever Changing Times.

On February 26, 2010, the band reformed and reunited for a brief tour of Europe in the summer to benefit Mike Porcaro, who had been diagnosed with ALS. The lineup featured David Paich, Steve Lukather, Steve Porcaro, Simon Phillips, Joseph Williams, and special guest Nathan East.

Steve Lukather stated that the band still existed:

Edit to 2010.. well with Mike not being well and some of us missing each other the REAL high school friends (yes that includes Joe!!) got back together for the RIGHT reason. People want to hear the hits played the way they were recorded, Joe has his voice back 100% and I loved having that power in front again and all REAL, BIG vocals again strong and seeing Paich AND Steve Porcaro with THOSE real keyboard sounds, Simon back and as Lee was busy having old pal Nate East step in.. it was so much fun and so successful we thought "Hmm, maybe a few gigs once in awhile would be fun" and we can make some money etc.. please some of the hard core fans. We ALL have outside careers that keep us all busy, not to mention families etc.. no one really wants to make new music, not a full record anyway. MAYBE a track someday but not in the near future. I am on tour for a year anyway and enjoying a very successful sold out solo tour and my record sales are better than they have ever been so I dont wanna mess THAT up and everyone has their own very busy successful lives and once in awhile.. why not right? There is no covert BS goin on here.

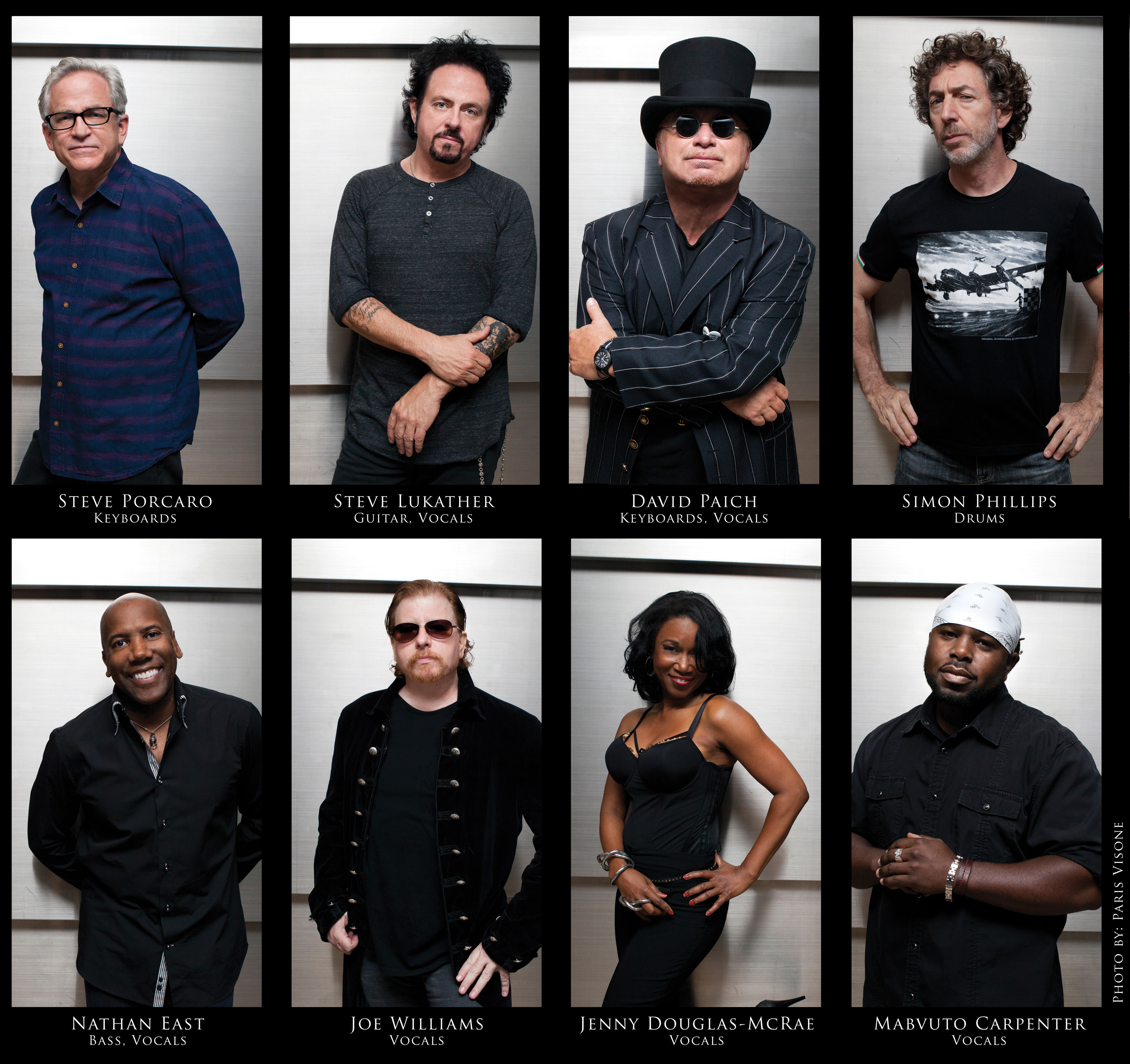
Promotional image of Toto in 2012. From top to bottom: Steve Porcaro; Steve Lukather; David Paich; Simon Phillips; Nathan East; Joseph Williams; Jenny Douglas-Foote; Mabvuto Carpenter

On October 11, 2010, Steve Lukather released his next solo album, All's Well That Ends Well.

Another tour in the summer of 2011 took place with former backup singer Jenny Douglas-Foote once again joining. Their show on July 17, 2011, in Verona, Italy was recorded for a live DVD but has yet to be released because of a contractual issue with their former label. They once again toured Europe in 2012.

=== 2013–2014: 35th anniversary, Simon Phillips's departure, and David Hungate's return ===
In 2013, celebrating their 35th anniversary, the band embarked on tour across Europe and North America, along with Japanese dates to follow in 2014. Their show on June 25, 2013, in Łódź, Poland was recorded for a live release and was released on April 29, 2014. On November 5, it was confirmed both on Toto's and David Paich's official Facebook pages that a new studio album was in the works and that the band planned to go into the studio early 2014.

On January 21, 2013, Steve Lukather released a solo album, Transition, featuring former Toto touring bassist Leland Sklar, as well as Gregg Bissonette and Chad Smith.

On January 18, 2014, former vocalist Fergie Frederiksen died after a long battle with liver cancer. After the 2013 leg of the 35th anniversary tour, it was revealed via the band's official website on January 23, 2014, that Simon Phillips had departed the band to pursue a solo career. Phillips was then replaced by Steely Dan drummer Keith Carlock.

While Carlock was on the Japanese tour from April to May 2014, he did not join them for the North American tour and his role was filled by Shannon Forrest. Bass player Nathan East, who had been touring with them since 2010, left after the Japanese tour to pursue his own projects. In his stead, original bass player David Hungate rejoined the band. They once again toured the United States in spring 2014 as co-headliners with Michael McDonald. It was their most comprehensive tour on the continent in years.

=== 2015–2017: Toto XIV and Mike Porcaro's death ===
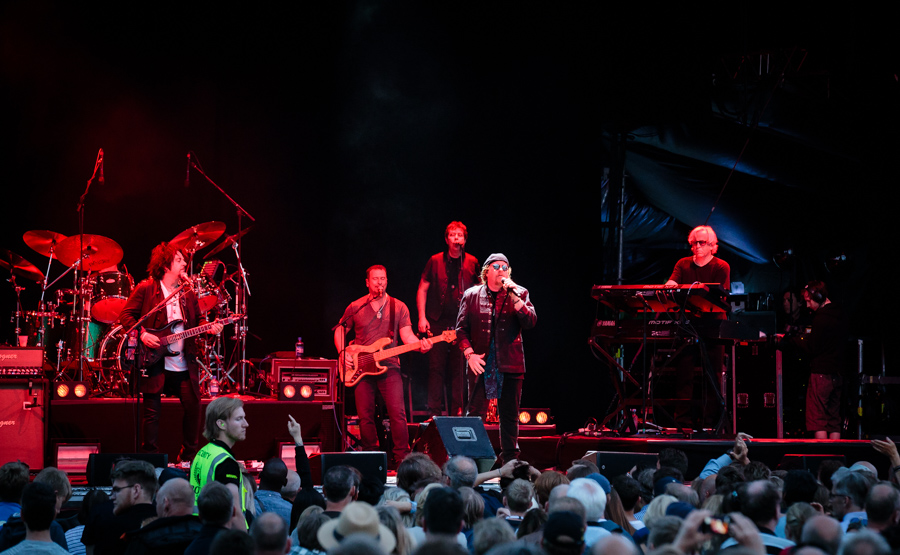
Toto performing at the Kongsberg Jazzfestival July 2017. From left to right: Steve Lukather, Shem von Schroeck, Warren Ham, Joseph Williams, Steve Porcaro

Toto released their fourteenth studio album and their first in nine years titled Toto XIV on March 20 (Europe), March 23 (UK and Oceania), and March 24, 2015 (North America). To promote the newly finished project, the band started a world tour running with an extensive European headline arena tour including appearances at key festivals, along with a North American tour to follow in the summer of 2015 and Asia later that year.

On March 15, 2015, former bassist Mike Porcaro died in his sleep at his home in Los Angeles, due to complications from his battle with ALS.

On April 6, 2015, Toto announced that they would embark on August 7, 2015, in Mashantucket, Connecticut, with the band Yes, on a joint summer tour of North America, due to end on September 12 in Coquitlam, British Columbia. Dave Santos took over bass from Dave Hungate for the final three dates of the tour and Shannon Forrest continued to perform as the band's drummer.

On September 29, 2015, Toto announced the first leg of their 2016 Tour in support of Toto XIV consisting of European and Japanese dates. Leland Sklar, who joined them on their 2007 and 2008 tours, replaced founding member Hungate. Sklar stopped touring with Toto in early 2017 and was replaced by Shem von Schroeck.

In June 2016, keyboardist Steve Porcaro released his first solo album, titled Someday/Somehow featuring Michael McDonald and Toto touring backing singer Mabvuto Carpenter.

=== 2018–2019: 40th anniversary albums, Old Is New, and second hiatus ===
On February 9, 2018, Toto released their anniversary album 40 Trips Around the Sun. They then embarked on a world tour promoting the album and celebrating 40 years of music. The band's lineup consisted of Joseph Williams, Steve Lukather, David Paich, and Steve Porcaro, and their touring musicians: Lenny Castro, Shannon Forrest, Warren Ham, and Shem von Schroeck.

On July 20, 2018, Toto announced: "David Paich will not be performing on the band's planned North American tour. He plans on focusing on his health and looks forward to returning to the road when ready to do so. In the absence of the founding keyboardist's presence on the tour, Dominique 'Xavier' Taplin (formerly with Prince) will be sitting in for David performing with Toto."

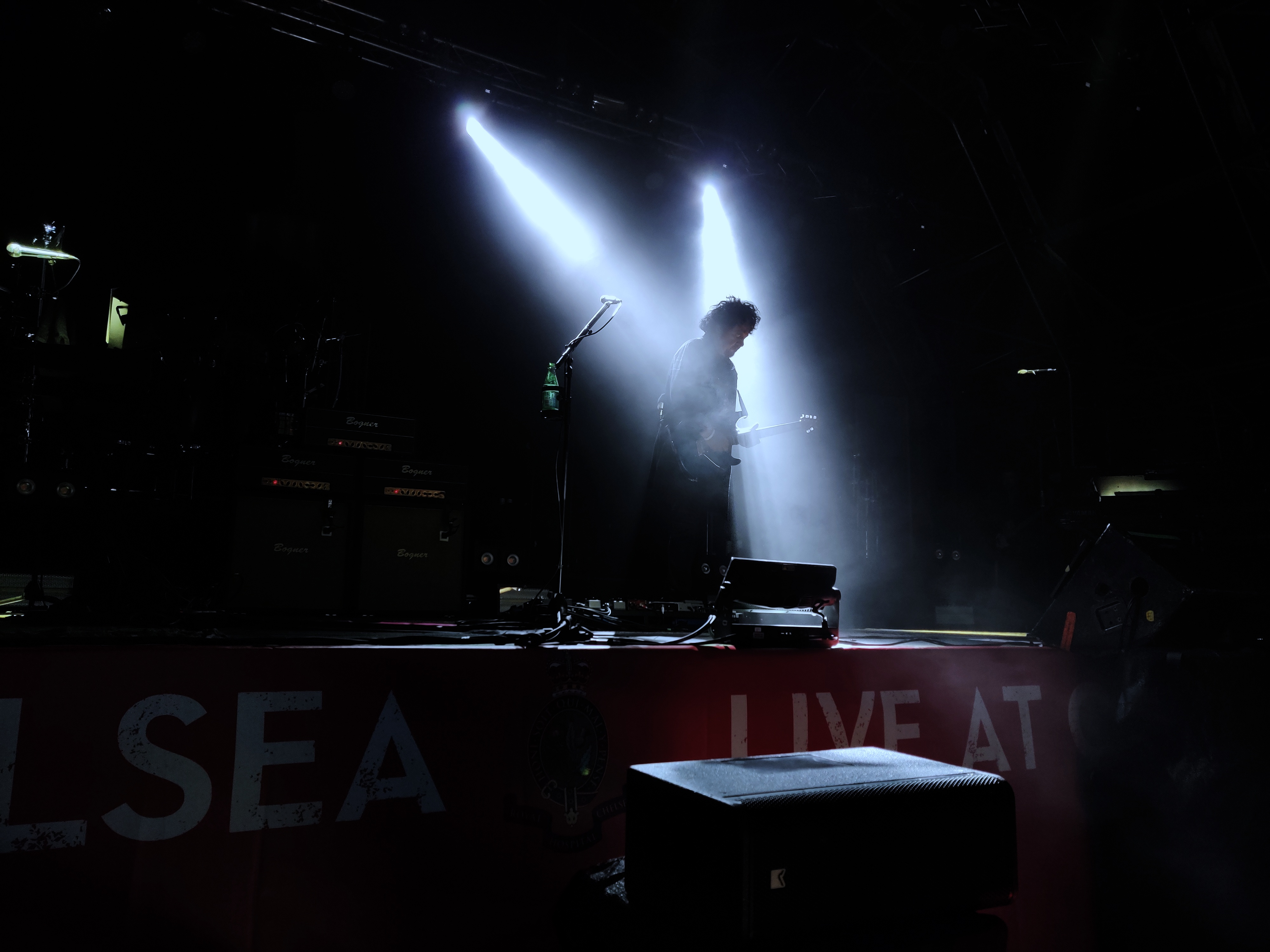
Guitarist Steve Lukather performing a solo on Toto's live cover version of George Harrison's "While My Guitar Gently Weeps" during the Live At Chelsea festival at the Royal Hospital Chelsea on June 13, 2019.

After the European leg of the tour, Toto covered Weezer's song "Hash Pipe" in response to their cover of Toto's 1981 number 1 single, "Africa". The band added the cover to their setlist as the encore for the 2018 North American leg of the tour.

On September 18, 2018, guitarist Steve Lukather released his autobiography The Gospel According to Luke, a humorous review on his life in music. An Audiobook was released shortly after on Audible.

On November 6, 2018, the band released the box set All In which contained their fourteenth studio album Old Is New. This contained the three new tracks already released on 40 Trips Around the Sun plus completed recordings of four other older tracks featuring Jeff Porcaro on drums and either Mike Porcaro or David Hungate on bass plus other new recordings.

On January 2, 2019, Toto kicked off their 2019 leg of the 40 Trips Around The Sun tour in Byron Bay at the Falls Festival. Xavier Taplin remained in place of Paich through that tour. Toto embarked upon a brief tour of North America on September 20, 2019. Steve Lukather stated that the tour would be the band's last for "a while", and that tensions within the band and its management had increased due to legal troubles, such as an ongoing lawsuit with the widow of founding member and drummer Jeff Porcaro, Susan Porcaro-Goings (current wife of Rick Goings). David Paich made a special appearance with the group at the tour opener in Los Angeles, singing and playing on “Africa” and “Home of the Brave”.

On October 16, 2019, Steve Lukather stated that after the final show in Philadelphia on October 20, 2019, it would mark the "end of this configuration of Toto". Steve Lukather had also announced that there is a film about Toto in the works, and hinted that he would be writing a new book, titled The New Testament According to Luke. David Paich made another special appearance at the final show in Philadelphia to again perform "Africa" and "Home of the Brave".

=== 2020–present: Second reformation and Dogz of Oz Tour ===
On October 19, 2020, it was announced that Steve Lukather and Joseph Williams would return to touring under the band name, in a proposed worldwide tour in 2021, known as the Dogz of Oz Tour. The new band lineup would feature bassist John Pierce (Huey Lewis and the News, Pablo Cruise, and a long-time session player), drummer Robert "Sput" Searight (Ghost-Note, Snarky Puppy), and keyboardists Dominique "Xavier" Taplin (Prince, Ghost-Note) and Steve Maggiora (Robert Jon & the Wreck), as well as multi-instrumentalist Warren Ham. The tour began with a soft-opening: a worldwide live-streamed performance on November 21, 2020, during which David Paich appeared with the band for the final two songs. On April 12, 2021, the band announced that the Dogz of Oz World Tour would be pushed to 2022.

On April 14, 2021, the band announced that they would release a new live album, With a Little Help from My Friends, through Mascot Label Group/The Players Club. Released on June 25, the album contains the streamed performance of November 2020, and was preceded by the release of two singles, live renditions of "Till The End" and "You Are The Flower". On June 28, 2021, Lukather stated that the group has no plans to record any future studio albums, though he was open to working with Williams on solo projects.

Toto began 2022 with a 40-city tour through major U.S. basketball and hockey arenas, serving as the opening act for Journey. David Paich joined Toto for the final four songs (Home of the Brave, With a Little Help From My Friends, Rosanna and Africa) in several shows. He also joined the band for the European leg of the tour at the Amsterdam show on July 15, 2022. On August 16, 2022, Greg Phillinganes returned to the Toto lineup for the first time since the Falling In Between tour in 2008, filling in for regular touring keyboardist, Dominique Xavier Taplin, who was forced to return home shortly before the end of the European leg of the tour, citing family reasons. Phillinganes's stay with the band was only temporary though, as Taplin returned to the band on August 23, 2022, for their show in Luxembourg.

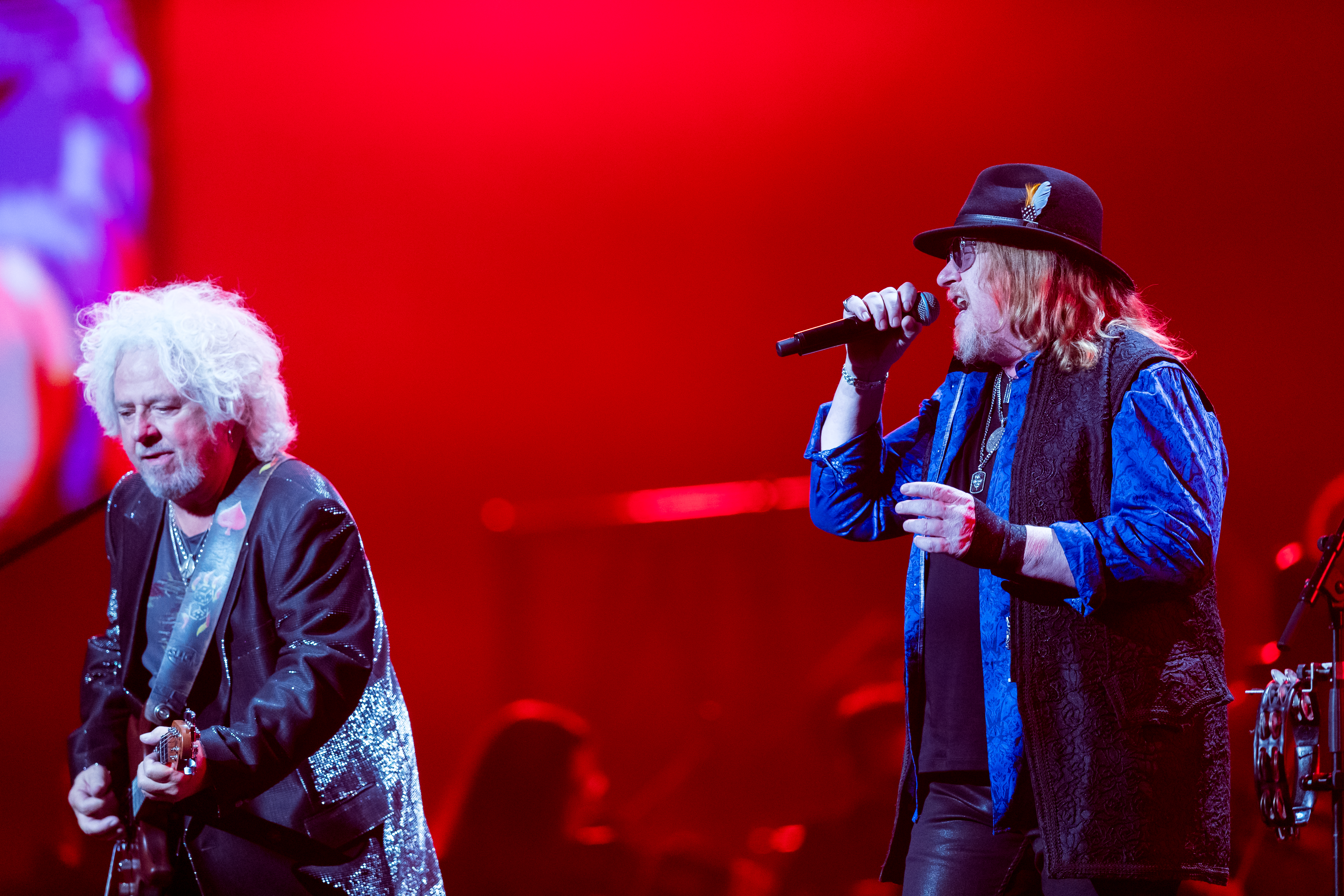
Toto performing at the Night of the Proms concert at SAP Arena, Mannheim, Baden-Württemberg, Germany January 2023. From right: Steve Lukather; Joseph Williams

Toto toured with Journey again in early 2023, before performing several concerts on its own in Japan during the summer. The band performed in November and December in Belgium and Germany for the Night of the Proms 2023, beginning in Antwerp.

It was announced on September 25, 2023, that Toto and Journey would tour North America together for the third straight year, with concerts scheduled from February–April 2024.

In January 2024, Toto announced on Facebook the return of keyboardist Greg Phillinganes and drummer Shannon Forrest ahead of their "Dogz of Oz" tour in 2024, replacing Taplin and Searight. On June 15, 2024, it was announced that Dennis Atlas was the new 2nd keyboardist for their upcoming tours, replacing keyboardist and vocalist Steve Maggiora.

In the second half of 2024, Toto toured Europe from late June–late July, returned to perform in its hometown of Los Angeles at the Hollywood Bowl on September 1, 2024, and then played a series of concerts in Latin American countries such as Mexico, Argentina, and Colombia.

Toto announced additional European appearances for February–March 2025. Christopher Cross, who opened for Toto at the Hollywood Bowl, would also serve as the opening act in Europe. Following that, Toto also announced tour dates in Australia and New Zealand, again with Christopher Cross as the opener.

On August 24, 2025, the band performed for the first time at The Forum in Inglewood, California as part of their co-headlining tour with Christopher Cross and Men at Work.

On January 2, 2026, Phillinganes announced that he would be stepping away from the band to focus on his family. On May 5, 2026, drummer Shannon Forrest announced he would be leaving the band. The next day, it was announced that former member Keith Carlock would replace him.

== Session work (1970s to early 1990s) ==
Before and during Toto, members of the band did session work for a slew of notable musicians. The first such session, which also led to the birth of the band, was with Boz Scaggs, in which Jeff Porcaro, David Paich, David Hungate, and Joe Porcaro (regular Toto guest contributor and father of Jeff, Steve, and Mike) played on Scaggs's album Silk Degrees. The members had done smaller scale work together before this, including with Steely Dan, Seals and Crofts, and Sonny & Cher. Steve Lukather provided the main guitar work on Michael Jackson's hit "Beat It", although Eddie Van Halen played the guitar solo in the bridge. Jeff Porcaro played drums on that track, while Steve Porcaro programmed synthesizer for the Thriller album and also wrote and composed "Human Nature".

In 1978, David Foster brought David Hungate, Steve Lukather, Steve Porcaro, and Toto vocalist Bobby Kimball to play on Alice Cooper's 1978 album From the Inside. In 1982, the rock band Chicago brought in Foster to produce their album Chicago 16. Under his direction, the band adopted more of a soft rock sound, shed most of its jazz fusion/horn section sound, and brought in many session musicians, including Steve Lukather, David Paich, and Steve Porcaro.

They have also played with legendary jazz player Miles Davis. Members of Toto have also collaborated with Larry Carlton, Pink Floyd, Quincy Jones, Eric Clapton, Paul McCartney, James Newton Howard, Michael McDonald, the Eagles, Earth, Wind & Fire, Yes, Eddie Van Halen, Los Lobotomys, Yoso, Richard Page (of Mr. Mister, who was proposed to replace Bobby Kimball), and Ringo Starr & His All-Starr Band (also featuring Richard Page).

== Band members ==
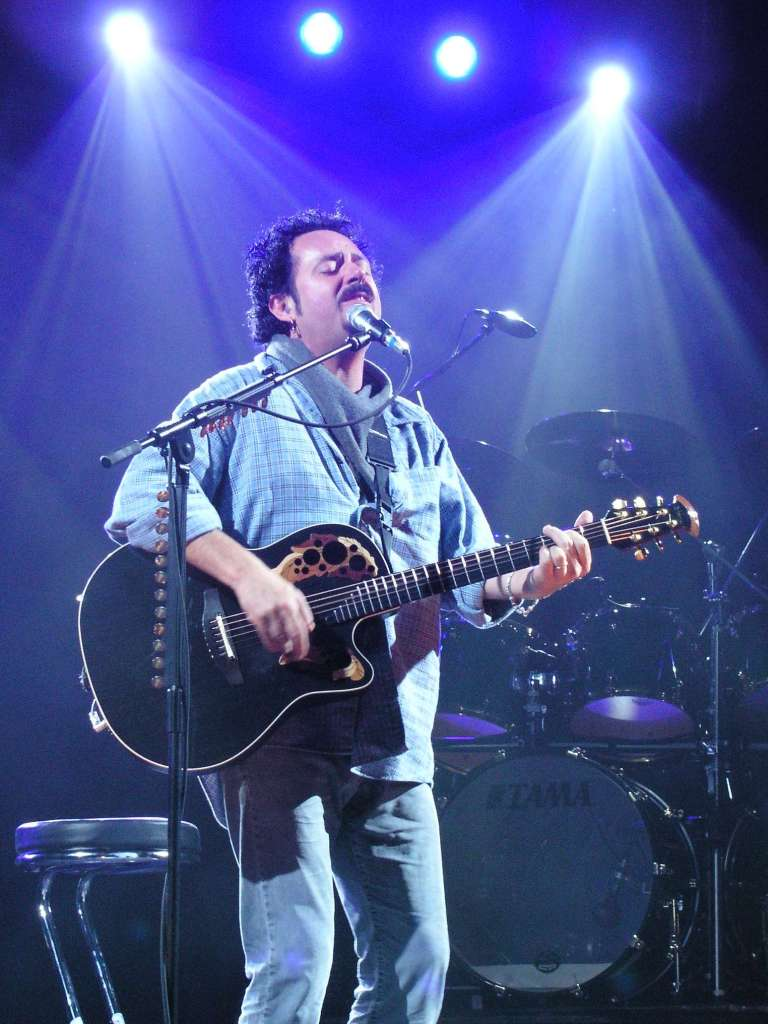
Lukather

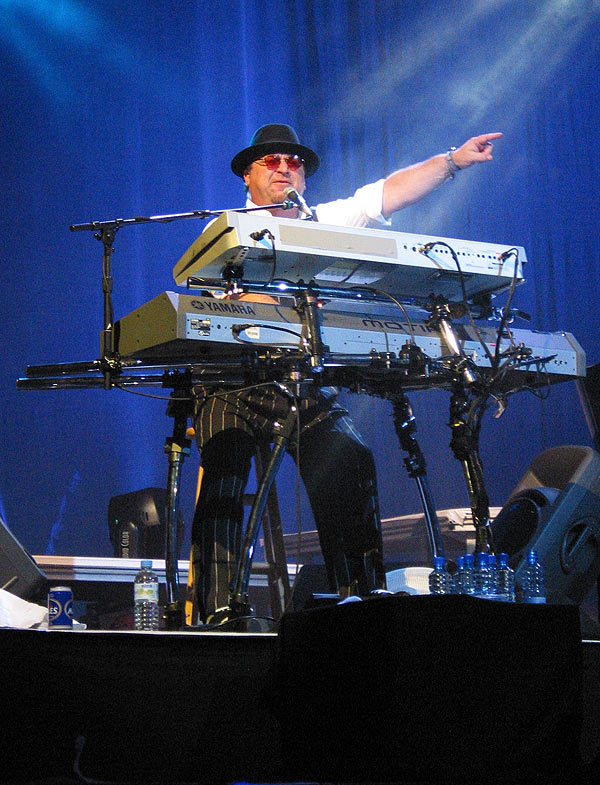
Paich

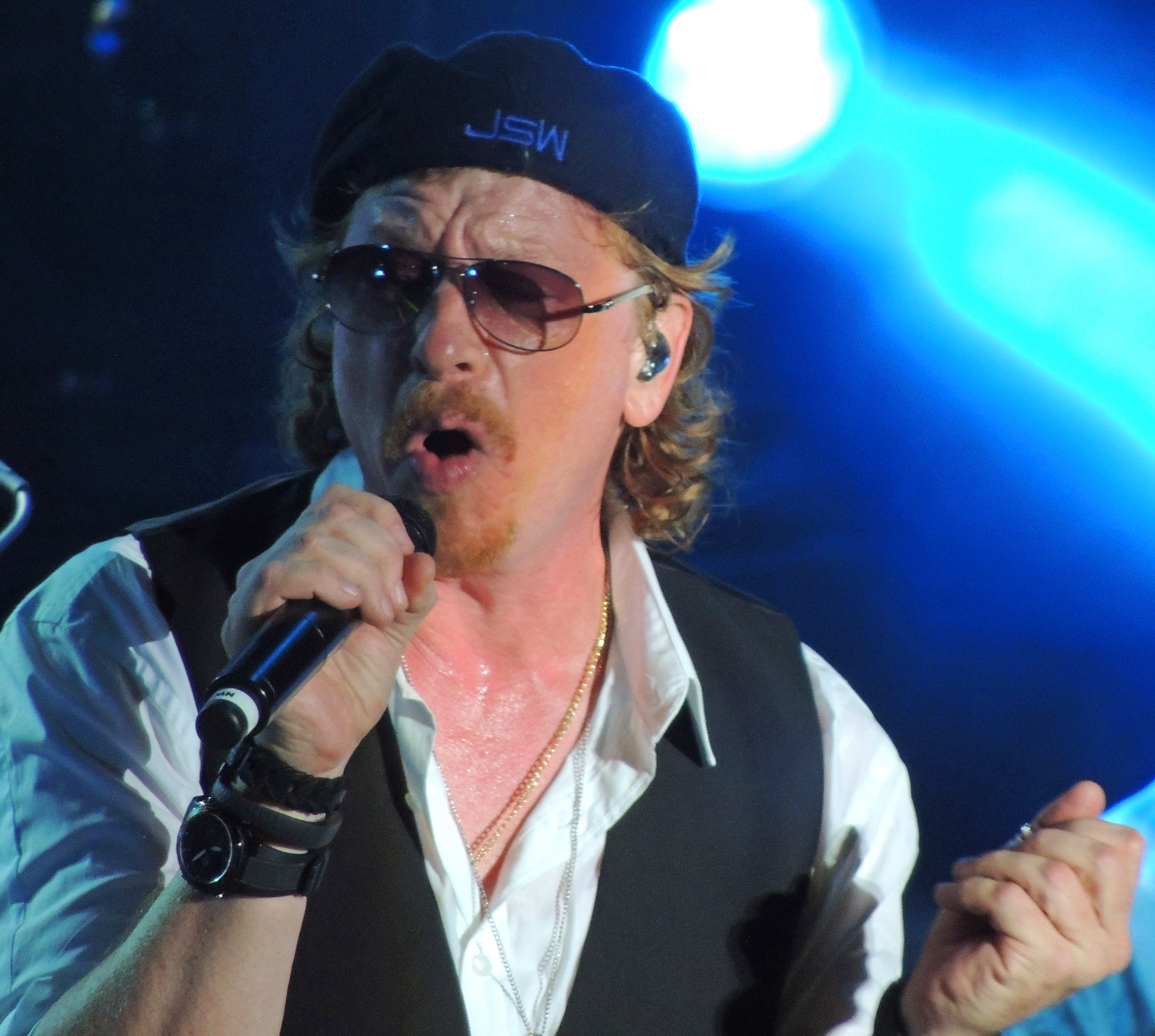
Williams

Current members

- Steve Lukather – guitar, lead and backing vocals (1977–2008, 2010–2019, 2020–present)
- David Paich – keyboards, lead and backing vocals (1977–2008, 2010–2019, 2020–present; touring hiatus with sparse appearances 2005–2008, 2018–2019, 2020–present)
- Joseph Williams – lead and backing vocals, tambourine (1986–1988, 2010–2019, 2020–present)

Current touring members

- Warren Ham – saxophone, harmonica, flute, backing and occasional lead vocals, percussion (1986–1988, 2017–2019, 2020–present)
- Keith Carlock – drums, percussion, backing vocals (2014, 2026–present; official member in 2014)
- John Pierce – bass (2020–present)
- Dennis Atlas – keyboards, backing and lead vocals (2024–present)
- Rai Thistlethwayte – keyboards, backing vocals (2026–present)

== Discography ==
Studio albums

- Toto (1978)
- Hydra (1979)
- Turn Back (1981)
- Toto IV (1982)
- Isolation (1984)
- Fahrenheit (1986)
- The Seventh One (1988)
- Kingdom of Desire (1992)
- Tambu (1995)
- Mindfields (1999)
- Through the Looking Glass (2002)
- Falling in Between (2006)
- Toto XIV (2015)
- Old Is New (2018)

Soundtrack album

- Dune (1984)

== Awards and nominations ==
Grammy Awards

Year	Nominee / work	Award	Result
1979	Toto	Best New Artist	Nominated
1983	Toto	Producer of the Year	Won
1983	"Rosanna"	Record of the Year	Won
1983	"Rosanna"	Song of the Year	Nominated
1983	"Rosanna"	Best Pop Vocal Performance by a Duo or Group	Nominated
1983	"Rosanna"	Best Vocal Arrangement for Two or More Voices	Won
1983	"Rosanna"	Best Instrumental Arrangement Accompanying Vocal(s)	Won
1983	Toto IV	Album of the Year	Won
1983	Toto IV	Best Engineered Recording, Non-Classical	Won
1997	Tambu	Best Engineered Recording, Non-Classical	Nominated
2000	Mindfields	Best Engineered Recording, Non-Classical	Nominated

Other awards

In 1986, Toto won a Crystal Globe award, signifying sales of more than 5 million records outside of their home country.

== Tours ==
- Toto Tour (1978–1979)
- Hydra Tour (1980)
- Toto IV Tour (1982)
- Isolation Tour (1985)
- Fahrenheit Tour (1986–1987)
- The Seventh One Tour (1988)
- Planet Earth Tour (1990)
- European Summer Festival Tour (1991)
- Kingdom of Desire Tour (1992–1993)
- Tambu Tour (1995–1996)
- Toto XX Reunion Tour (1998)
- Mindfields Tour (1999–2001)
- Through the Looking Glass Tour (2002)
- 25th Anniversary Tour (2003–2004)
- Falling in Between Tour (2006–2008)
- Mike Porcaro Honor Tour (2010)
- In the Blink of an Eye Tour (2011–2012)
- 35th Anniversary Tour (2013–2014)
- Toto XIV Tour (2015–2016)
- An Evening with Toto Tour (2017)
- 40 Tours Around the Sun Tour (2018–2019)
- The Dogz of Oz Tour (2022–present)
