= I'll Be Over You =

1986 single by Toto

Single by Toto

from the album Fahrenheit
- B-side: "In a Word"
- Released: August 1986
- Recorded: 1985
- Genre: Soft rock
- Length: 3:51
- Label: Columbia
- Songwriters: Steve Lukather; Randy Goodrum
- Producer: Toto

Toto singles chronology
"Endless" (1985)	"I'll Be Over You" (1986)	"Till The End" (1986)

Music video
- "I'll Be Over You" on YouTube

"I'll Be Over You" is a hit single by the American rock band Toto. Released as the lead single from their 1986 album, Fahrenheit, the song reached number 11 on the Billboard Hot 100 chart in 1986. Lead vocals were sung by guitarist Steve Lukather, who co-wrote the song with hit songwriter Randy Goodrum (one of several collaborations between the two). Guest musician Michael McDonald provided the vocal counterpoint on the recording.

"I'll Be Over You" spent two weeks at number one on the Adult Contemporary chart, Toto's second song to top this chart (following 1983's "I Won't Hold You Back").

The single's B-side, "In A Word", was later re-released on the compilation album Toto XX in 1998.

== Composition ==
Lukather explained the song's lyrics: "What the song is basically saying is, the guy has broken up with a girl, and realized that he should never have broken up with this girl, and he's still really deeply in love with her. Sort of like a warning to people, like, you never know how good you got it until you don't have it anymore."

== Reception ==
Cash Box said that "the wistful and emotional song should make a strong showing."

== Music video ==
A music video (in which guest vocalist McDonald also appears) was shot with the band playing on an apartment rooftop until it rained. The apartment building in question is located at 548 South Spring Street in Los Angeles, California, USA. The video also recreates the image from the front of the album with live actors.

== Track listing ==
1. "I'll Be Over You"
2. "In a Word" – Non-album track, later released on Toto XX

== Personnel ==
Adapted from Fahrenheit album liner notes.

Toto

- Steve Lukather – lead and backing vocals, guitars
- Joseph Williams – backing vocals
- David Paich – keyboards
- Steve Porcaro – synthesizers
- Mike Porcaro – bass
- Jeff Porcaro – drums

Additional musicians

- Lenny Castro – percussion
- Paulinho da Costa – percussion
- Michael McDonald – backing vocals

== Charts ==
=== Weekly ===
Chart (1986–1987)	Peak position
Canada (The Record)	34
Canada (RPM)	13
Netherlands (Single Top 100)	38
US Billboard Hot 100	11
US Adult Contemporary (Billboard)	1

=== Year-end ===
Chart (1986)	Rank
Canada (RPM)	99
US Billboard Hot 100	99

== Certifications ==
Region	Certification	Certified units/sales
United States (RIAA)	Gold	500,000^{‡}
^{‡} Sales+streaming figures based on certification alone.

== See also ==
- List of Hot Adult Contemporary number ones of 1986
