= Langdon Bay Creek =

River in Minnesota, United States

Coordinates: 44°55′56″N 93°39′58″W

Langdon Bay Creek

Langdon Bay Creek is a creek in Mound, Minnesota, United States. It is the outflow for, and connects, Lake Langdon (or Bay) to Mound's Lost Lake, which is part of Lake Minnetonka. Its length is perhaps 200 feet (61 m) long and it runs west to east. It is unnavigable and passes under Commerce Boulevard through a culvert. It has also been known as Sollie's Creek, named after the uncles of the Andrews Sisters who owned a grocery store to the south of it.

It is part of the Langdon Lake subwatershed of the Minnehaha Creek Watershed District (MCWD), with the drainage from about 1,055 acres (4.27 km^{2}) running through it. Other lakes in the subwatershed whose outflows eventually pass through it are Saunders Lake, Black Lake, and Mound's old sewer plant holding pond.
