= Isolation (Toto album) =

1984 studio album by Toto

Studio album by Toto
- Released: November 5, 1984
- Recorded: April 1983–Summer 1984
- Studios: Record One (Los Angeles); The Villa (Los Angeles); The Manor (Los Angeles); Additional recording: Sunset Sound (Hollywood); Bill Schnee Studio (North Hollywood); Can-Am Recorders (Tarzana); Abbey Road Studios (London)
- Genres: Hard rock; arena rock
- Length: 41:42
- Label: Columbia
- Producer: Toto

Toto chronology
Toto IV (1982)	Isolation (1984)	Dune (1984)

Singles from Isolation
- 1. "Stranger in Town" Released: October 15, 1984; 2. "Angel Don't Cry" Released: 1984 (Aus.); 3. "Holyanna" Released: January 1985; 4. "How Does It Feel" Released: February 1985; 5. "Endless" Released: April 1985 (UK)

Isolation (stylized as (ī’so-lā’tīon)) is the fifth studio album by American rock band Toto, released on November 5, 1984. It is the first album to include Mike Porcaro as the band's official bassist (after the departure of David Hungate) and the only album with Fergie Frederiksen as the primary vocalist.

While Isolation failed to achieve the popularity of its predecessor, Toto IV, it achieved gold record status and gave the band their highest charting mainstream rock (chart) single "Stranger in Town" (No. 7).

Relatively few songs from this album were featured in live performances after 1985's Isolation World Tour due to Frederiksen's departure and the lack of well-known material from the album.

== Background and recording ==
While Toto IV was a massive, Grammy-winning success, Toto elected not to continue touring in 1983, a decision Steve Lukather has since regretted as a missed opportunity to become a "US-arena rock band."

As the band began sessions for Isolation, vocalist Bobby Kimball reportedly struggled with his vocals. Kimball said in 2005 that he sang lead on "more than half" of the album, although Lukather has stated that he only recorded a lead vocal on the track "Lion." He did record background vocals for three songs on the album, "Lion," "Stranger in Town," and "Holyanna." He also co-wrote and sang lead vocals on the song "Right Part of Me", which was released in 1998 on the album Toto XX. Kimball and the band parted ways in April 1984. Over the course of the year, Toto would focus on other projects, notably the soundtrack for the film Dune and the boxing theme of the 1984 Olympic Games.

When the band finally began auditioning potential lead vocalists, the band sifted through around 15 video auditions. The job was first offered to Richard Page, who ultimately declined the offer because he had a contract for his band, Mr. Mister. Lukather then wanted to offer the job to Eric Martin, later of Mr. Big, but Jeff was interested in Fergie Frederiksen, then lead singer of the band LeRoux. Frederiksen, who at the time was doing production work in Germany, joined the band in a rehearsal hall and secured the position after running four songs with the band. On Isolation, Frederiksen co-wrote "Angel Don't Cry", "Mr. Friendly", "Change of Heart", and the title track.

The first cover design for Isolation was created by David Lynch, with whom Toto had worked on Dune. Though the band reportedly spent $25,000 on the work, the members were ultimately disappointed in it and did not use it. This cover also included Kimball. Jeff Porcaro ultimately persuaded the band to use a surreal image by artist Robert Kopecky.

While the band was proud of the finished album, Lukather has noted that it was clear Isolation did not "sound like the work of the same band that had made Toto IV." Toto wanted to release the track "Endless," on which Frederiksen sang lead, as the first single. However, Columbia Records opted for "Stranger in Town," sung by David Paich and thought to be more similar to the hit "Africa." While "Stranger in Town" was a Top 30 hit, it was a disappointment compared to the chart topping success of the singles from Toto IV. The promo music video (featuring actor Brad Dourif) for the track was, however, nominated for MTV Video of the Year.

Lukather thought that the tour to support Isolation was disastrous; Toto had been booked into arenas based on the success of Toto IV, the 10,000-seat venues were sparsely attended and, according to Lukather, the band "lost their shirts" on the tour. A tour of Europe was ultimately cancelled and Toto fired their booking agents.

Isolation would eventually achieve gold status in the United States and triple platinum status in Japan. Although Frederiksen would begin work with Toto on their sixth album, Fahrenheit, he struggled with the vocals for the first track, "Could This Be Love," and the band moved on to Lukather's childhood friend (and son of Academy Award-Winning Composer John Williams) Joseph Williams.

== Reception ==
Professional ratings
Review scores
Source	Rating
AllMusic	3/5 stars
Rolling Stone	1/5 stars

AllMusic's retrospective review praised the performances of Jeff Porcaro, David Paich, and Steve Lukather in passing but dismissed Isolation as "a Journey clone album, minus the aching ballads that had made Journey such a success."

== Track listing ==
All lead vocals by Dennis "Fergie" Frederiksen, except where noted.

Side one
No.	Title	Writer(s)	Lead vocals	Length
1.	"Carmen"	David Paich, Jeff Porcaro	Frederiksen, Paich	3:25
2.	"Lion"	Paich, Bobby Kimball		4:46
3.	"Stranger in Town"	Paich, J. Porcaro	Paich	4:47
4.	"Angel Don't Cry"	Paich, Fergie Frederiksen		4:21
5.	"How Does It Feel"	Steve Lukather	Lukather	3:50

Side two
No.	Title	Writer(s)	Lead vocals	Length
6.	"Endless"	Paich		3:40
7.	"Isolation"	Paich, Frederiksen, Lukather		4:04
8.	"Mr. Friendly"	Paich, J. Porcaro, Frederiksen, Lukather, Mike Porcaro		4:22
9.	"Change of Heart"	Paich, Frederiksen		4:08
10.	"Holyanna"	Paich, J. Porcaro	Paich	4:19

== Personnel ==
=== Toto ===
- Fergie Frederiksen – lead vocals (1, 2, 4, 6–9), backing vocals
- Steve Lukather – guitars, lead vocals (5), backing vocals
- David Paich – piano, keyboards, synthesizers, lead vocals (1, 3, 10), backing vocals, orchestral arrangements (5, 9)
- Steve Porcaro – keyboards, synthesizers
- Mike Porcaro – bass
- Jeff Porcaro – drums, percussion

==== Additional musicians ====
- Mike Cotten – additional synthesizers (3)
- Lenny Castro – congas, percussion
- Joe Porcaro – percussion
- Tom Scott – saxophones
- Chuck Findley – trumpet
- Jerry Hey – trumpet, horn arrangements (2)
- James Newton Howard – orchestral arrangements and conductor (5, 9)
- Marty Paich – conductor (5, 9)
- The London Symphony Orchestra – strings (5, 9)
- Bobby Kimball – backing vocals (2, 3, 9, 10)
- Gene Morford – bass vocal (3)
- Richard Page – backing vocals (3, 5)
- Tom Kelly – backing vocals (5)

=== Technical ===
- Produced by Toto
- Mixed by Greg Ladanyi and Toto
- Engineered by Greg Ladanyi, Tom Knox, Shep Lonsdale, and Niko Bolas
- Assistant engineers – Richard Bosworth, Duane Seykora, Tom Fletcher, Bill Jackson, Terry Christian, Peggy McCreary, Stuart Furusho, David Schober, Brian Malouf, Ann Calnan, and Franz Pusch
- Strings recorded by John Kurlander at Abbey Road Studios (London, England)
- Mastered by Doug Sax at The Mastering Lab (Los Angeles, CA)
- Techs – Ed Simeone (keyboards), Dick Gall (guitars), Paul "Jamo" Jamieson (drums), Shep Lonsdale (engineer), Willie MacInnes (road manager)
- Art direction and design – Bill Murphy
- Illustration – Robert Kopecky
- Photography – Raul Vega

== Additional notes ==
Catalogue: (LP) Columbia 9C9-39911, (CD) Columbia CK-38962

== Charts ==
=== Weekly charts ===
Chart	Peak position
Australian Kent Music Report	65
Canadian RPM Albums Chart	57
Dutch Mega Albums Chart	26
Finnish Albums Chart	17
French SNEP Albums Chart	12
Japanese Oricon LP Chart	2
Norwegian VG-lista Albums Chart	8
Swedish Albums Chart	8
Swiss Albums Chart	15
UK Albums Chart	67
U.S. Billboard 200	42
West German Media Control Albums Chart	15

=== Year-end charts ===
Chart (1984)	Position
French Albums Chart	74
Japanese Albums Chart (Oricon)	81

=== Certifications ===
Region	Certification
United States (RIAA)	Gold
