= Langdon Bay =

Langdon Bay may refer to:

- Langdon Bay (Kent), England
- Lake Langdon, Minnesota, also known as Langdon Bay
  - Langdon Bay Creek, its outflow
