= Holyanna =

1985 single by Toto

Single by Toto

from the album Isolation
- B-side: "Mr. Friendly"
- Released: January 1985
- Recorded: 1984
- Length: 4:19 (album version); 3:53 (single edit)
- Label: Columbia
- Songwriters: David Paich; Jeff Porcaro
- Producer: Toto

Toto singles chronology
"Dune (Desert Theme)" (1984)	"Holyanna" (1985)	"How Does It Feel" (1985)

"Holyanna" is a song by the American rock band Toto. It was released as the final song and third single from their fifth studio album Isolation. It was written by keyboardist David Paich and drummer Jeff Porcaro. It peaked at No. 71 on the Billboard Hot 100 as the second charting single from Isolation, following "Stranger in Town".

The song features former member Bobby Kimball performing on backing vocals. "Holyanna" also received a music video, which was produced by Simon Fields.

== Background ==
Paich wrote "Holyanna" about a composite of girls that flirted with him during his time attending a Catholic school. In an interview published in December 1983 during the making of the band's Isolation album, Steve Lukather mentioned that "Holyanna" was one of the songs planned for the album. In the United States, "Holyanna" was serviced to contemporary hit radio in January 1985, where it was added to 33 radio station playlists in that format.

== Reception ==
Billboard described "Holyanna" as featuring "jumpy rock n’ roll observations of life in high school’s fast lane." Cashbox called "Holyanna" a "good single" with "punchy" horns and an "airtight sound". They also wrote that the song "utilizes acoustic guitars and pure pop hooks with a countryish lyric and melodic sound", which they believed was indicative of "another CHR hit."

== Track listing ==
1. "Holyanna" - 3:53
2. "Mr. Friendly" - 4:18

== Personnel ==
Toto

- David Paich – keyboards, backing vocals, lead vocals
- Fergie Frederiksen – backing vocals
- Steve Lukather – guitars, backing vocals
- Steve Porcaro – keyboards, electronic sounds
- Mike Porcaro – bass
- Jeff Porcaro – drums, percussion

Additional musicians

- Lenny Castro – congas, percussion
- Joe Porcaro – percussion
- Tom Scott – saxophones
- Chuck Findley – trumpet
- Jerry Hey – trumpet
- Bobby Kimball – backing vocals

== Chart performance ==
Chart (1985)	Peak position
US Billboard Hot 100	71
