= Saunders Lake =

Lake in the state of Minnesota, United States

- in autumn

- Location within Minnesota Location within the United States
- Location: Minnetrista, Minnesota, United States
- Coordinates: 44.9295°N 93.6927°W
- Primary outflows: To Lake Langdon
- Basin countries: United States
- Surface area: 70 acres (28 ha)
- Surface elevation: 945 ft (288 m)

Saunders Lake is located in the United States state of Minnesota. It is a 70-acre (280,000 m^{2}) lake that is west-southwest of Minneapolis–Saint Paul in the Minneapolis suburbs of Mound and Minnetrista.

The first European settlers came to the area near Saunders Lake in the 1850s. In 1854, Nathaniel Sanders and J. F. Buck settled on its shores. Saunders Lake was named for Nathaniel Sanders..

The lake is a large, Type 5 wetland, classified as a Natural Environment lake.. The lake outlets through a small channel to Lake Langdon, which discharges through a culvert under County State-Aid Highway 110 into Lost Lake, which outlets into Cooks Bay of Lake Minnetonka. It is part of the Langdon Lake subwatershed of the Minnehaha Creek Watershed District.

The corridor between Black (also called Flanagan) and Saunders Lakes consists of wetlands and maple-basswood forest and has been identified by the Minnesota Department of Natural Resources as a regionally significant area with outstanding ecological value. Most of this area has been incorporated into Gale Woods Regional Park by the Three Rivers Park District.

Saunders Lake scores highly on vegetative diversity, fish and wildlife habitat, and is classified in the Preserve category.

Boating regulations

Saunders Lake does not have any boating or motor regulations. Here is the DNR list of Metro lakes with boating regulations.

== Wildlife ==
The lake is considered by many to be a great crappie fishing lake, and catfish and sunfish are also present. Beavers are present as evidenced by the downed trees on its north shore.

== Gallery ==
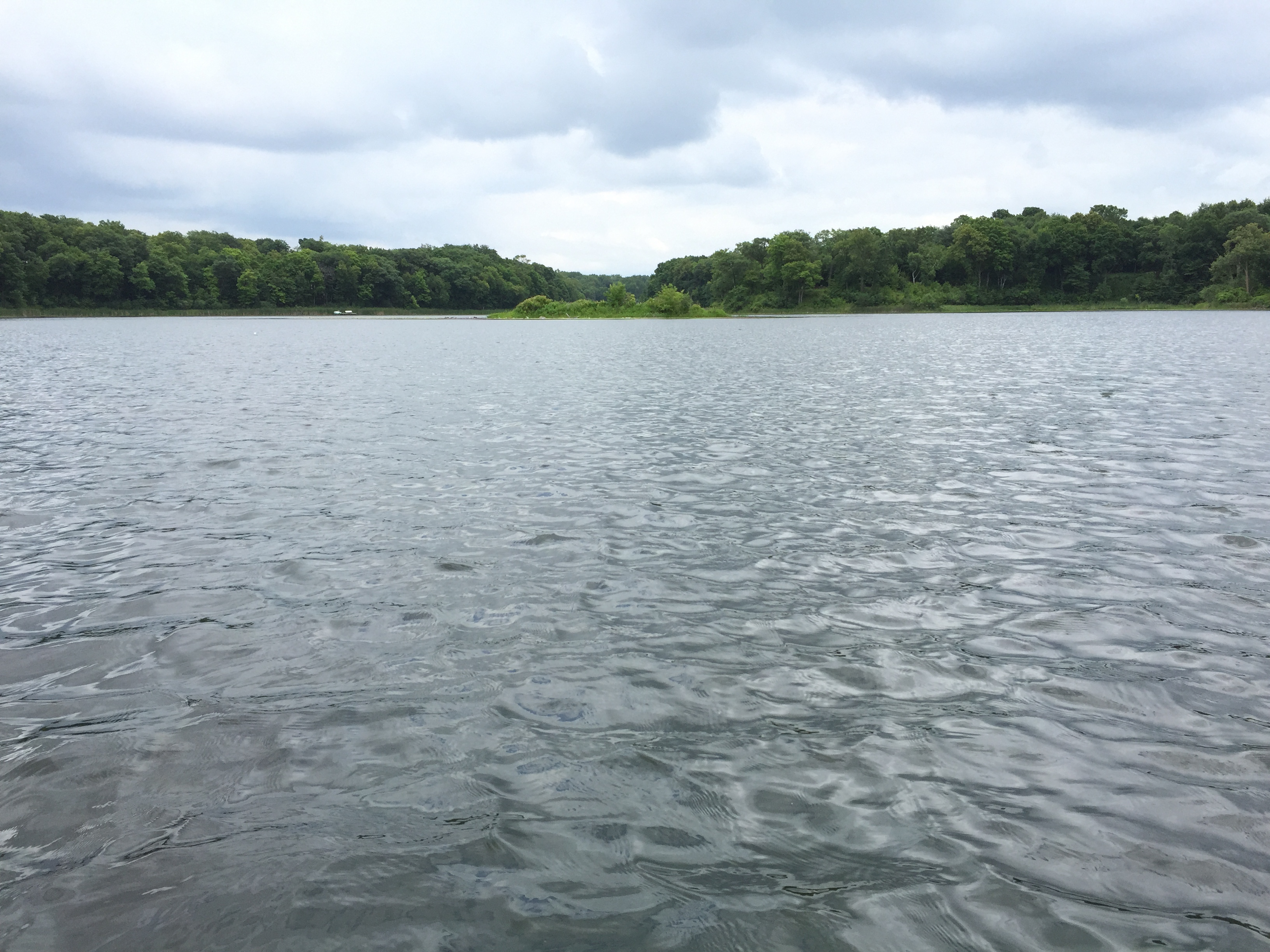
Looking towards the island on Saunders Lake

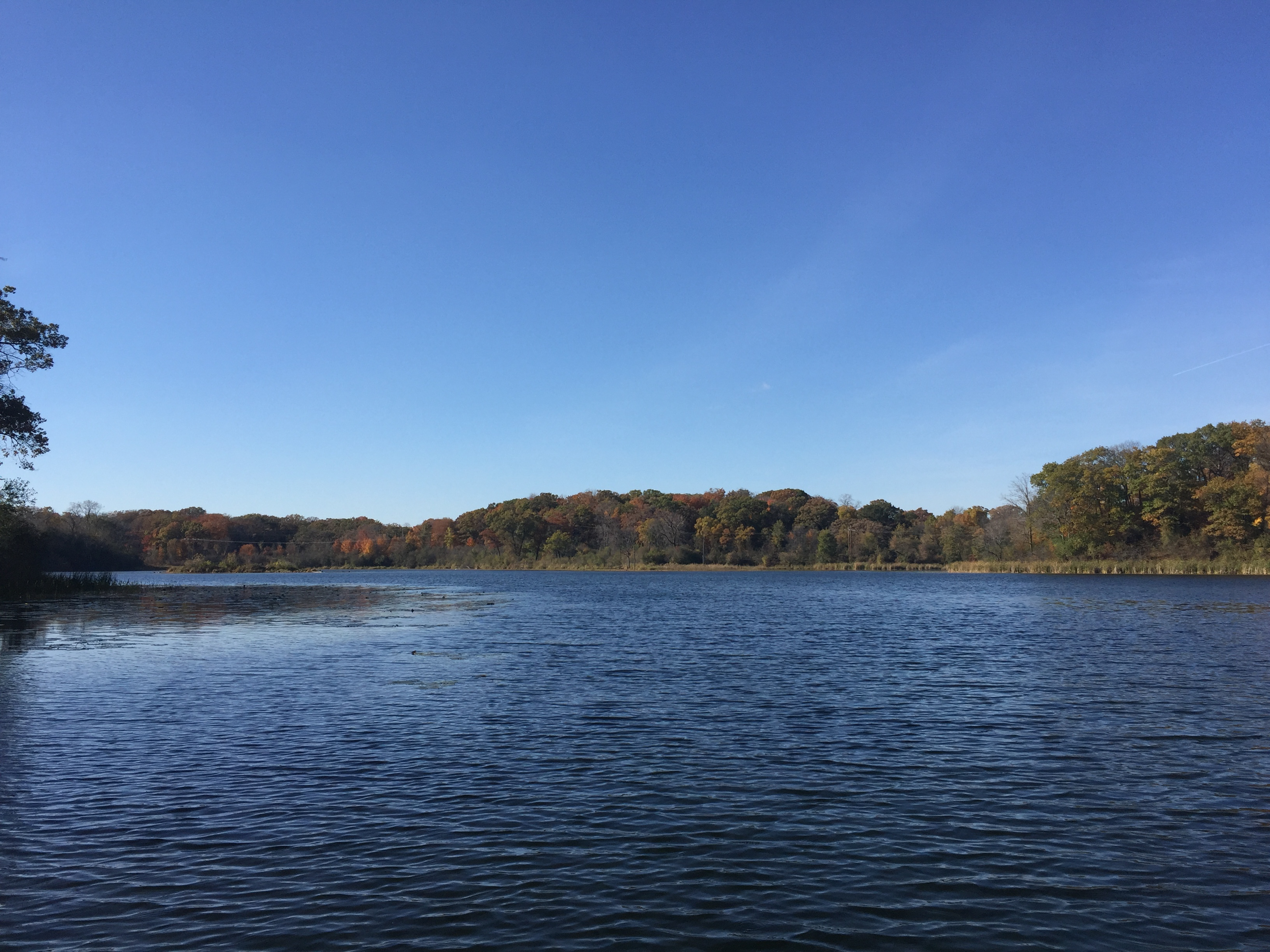
Fall day on Saunders Lake

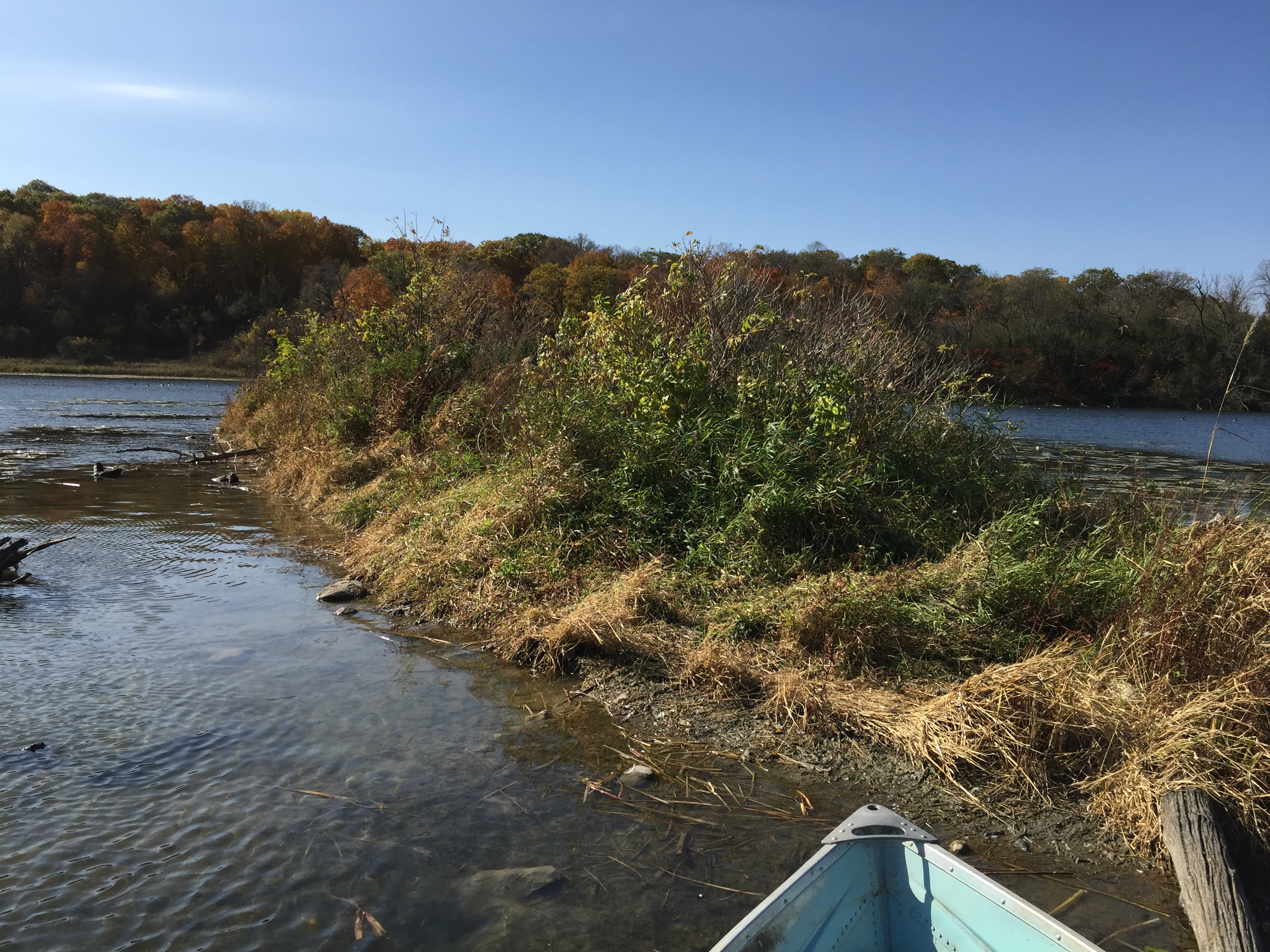
Island on Saunders Lake

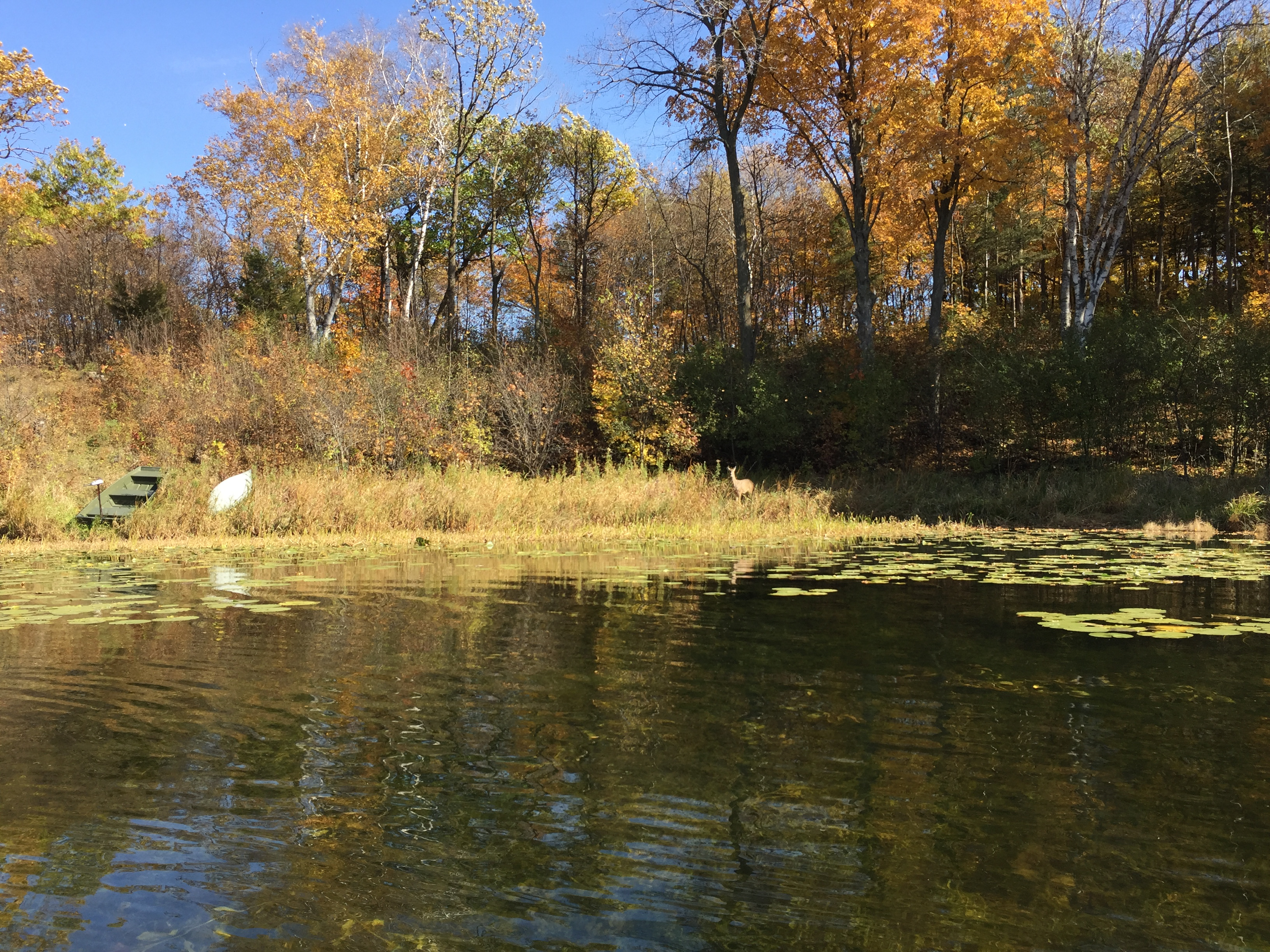
Deer on the shore of Saunders Lake

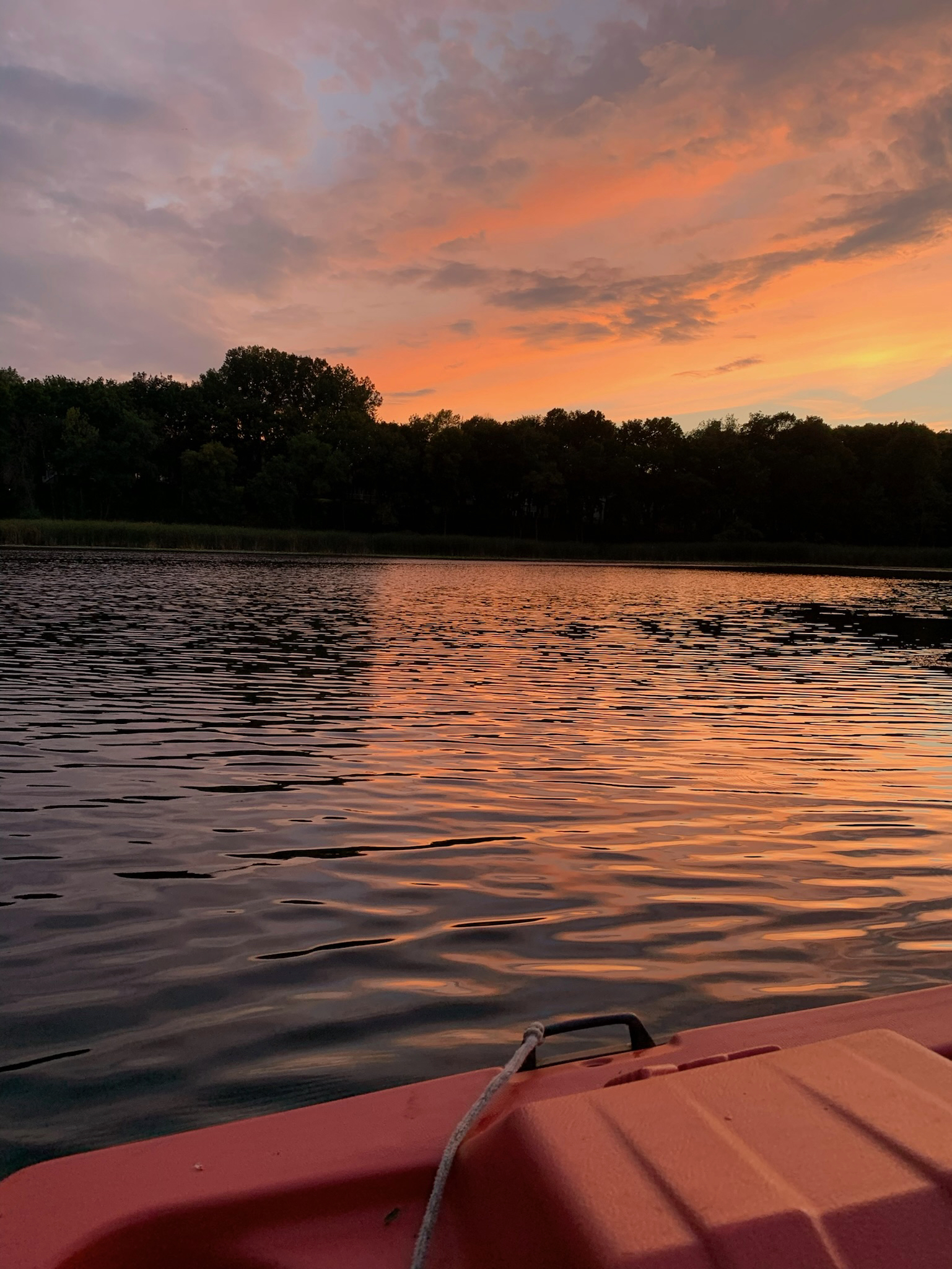
Sunset photo taken from the water

== Water Quality ==
Minnehaha Creek Watershed District has graded Saunders Lake a B− for water quality on a scale of A–F. Lakes with a B grade are defined as, “Generally good water quality but algae may limit swimming, particularly toward the end of the summer.”

== See also ==
- List of Minnesota lakes
