= Lake Langdon =

Lake in the state of Minnesota, United States

- Location within Minnesota Location within the United States
- Location: Mound, Minnesota
- Coordinates: 44°56′00″N 93°40′31″W
- Primary outflows: Langdon Bay Creek
- Basin countries: United States
- Surface area: 144 acres (0.6 km^{2})
- Average depth: 8.3 ft (2.5 m)
- Max. depth: 38 ft (12 m)
- Surface elevation: 929 ft (283 m)

Lake Langdon in Mound, Minnesota, has an area of 144 acres (0.6 km^{2}). Minnehaha Creek Watershed District (MCWD) charts show its maximum depth of 38 feet (12 m), though it would be classified as a shallow lake with a mean depth of 8.3 feet (2.5 m). It is named for R. V. Langdon, the first township clerk. It is located west of Commerce Boulevard and south of Lynwood Boulevard. Boats on the lake cannot navigate to the nearby Lake Minnetonka, though it overflows into Lost Lake, part of the Big Lake, through Langdon Bay Creek. It also serves as an outlet for Saunders Lake, to its west. The lake has a watershed area to surface area ratio of 6.5:1, meaning that it drains an area about 6½ times its size.

The lake (or bay as it is sometimes called) has an over abundance of phosphorus, that probably resulted from it being downstream from Mound's old sewer plant. The plant closed back in the late 1970s. Phosphorus is a catalyst that can contribute to excessive plant growth. Though the lake's MCWD Report Card shows a significant drop off of the phosphorus levels over the past 20 years, it is still a problem. A higher outflow from Langdon could lower the phosphorus level, but its water clarity remains poor, despite the fact that it was treated with Alum in 1998.

== Wildlife ==
Fish in the lake include bass, crappies, sunfish, and numerous carp and catfish. During the warmer months, Blue Heron and White Egrets fish the shoreline. Beavers are present on the western part of the bay as evidenced by the downed trees.

== See also ==
- Eutrophication - problems with Phosphorus
