= Last Safe Place =

Studio album by LeRoux
- Released: 1982
- Recorded: 1982
- Studios: Studio in the Country, Washington Parish, Louisiana
- Genre: Hard rock pop rock
- Label: RCA
- Producer: Leon Medica

LeRoux chronology
| Up (1980) | Last Safe Place (1982) | So Fired Up (1983) |

Singles from Last Safe Place
- 1. "Addicted" Released: 1982; 2. "The Last Safe Place On Earth" Released: 1982; 3. "Nobody Said It Was Easy" Released: 1982

Last Safe Place is the fourth album by LeRoux released in 1982. It is the band's last album with Jeff Pollard and Bob Campo involved.

The album peaked at #64 on the Billboard 200, becoming the band's most successful album. "Nobody Said It Was Easy" is the album's (and the band's) only Top 20 hit, peaking at #18 on the Billboard Hot 100.

== Track listing ==
Side A
| No. | Title | Writer(s) | Guitar Solo | Length |
|---|---|---|---|---|
| 1. | "Addicted" | Roddy | Pollard | 3:00 |
| 2. | "It Doesn't Matter" | Pollard, Roddy | Haselden | 3:50 |
| 3. | "Nobody Said It Was Easy" | Haselden | Haselden | 4:11 |
| 4. | "The Last Safe Place On Earth" | Pollard | Pollard | 3:13 |
| 5. | "Inspiration" | Medica, Pollard | | 4:00 |

Side B
| No. | Title | Writer(s) | Guitar Solo | Length |
|---|---|---|---|---|
| 6. | "You Know How Those Boys Are" | Haselden | | 3:27 |
| 7. | "Midnight Summer Dream" | Medica | | 3:21 |
| 8. | "Rock 'N' Roll Woman" | Stephen Stills | Pollard, Haselden | 3:26 |
| 9. | "Long Distance Lover" | Roddy | Pollard | 3:20 |
| 10. | "Make Believe" | Roddy | | 4:50 |

== Personnel ==
LeRoux

- Jeff Pollard – lead vocals, guitar
- Tony Haselden – electric guitar, acoustic guitar, lead and backing vocals
- Leon Medica – bass, backing vocals
- David Peters – drums, backing vocals
- Rod Roddy – lead and backing vocals, keyboards, synthesizer
- Bobby Campo – backing vocals, percussion

Additional musicians

- Claudette Rogers – backing vocals (5)
- Lon Price – saxophone (5, 10)

Production

- Producer: Leon Medica
- Engineers: Warren Dewey, David Farrell, Terry Christian
- Photography: David Kennedy

== Charts ==
Album

| Chart (1982) | Peak position |
|---|---|
| US Billboard 200 | 64 |

Singles

| Year | Single | Chart | Position |
|---|---|---|---|
| 1982 | "Addicted" | Billboard Top Tracks | 7 |
| 1982 | "The Last Safe Place On Earth" | Billboard Hot 100 | 77 |
| 1982 | "Nobody Said It Was Easy" | Billboard Hot 100 | 18 |
