= Lido Shuffle =

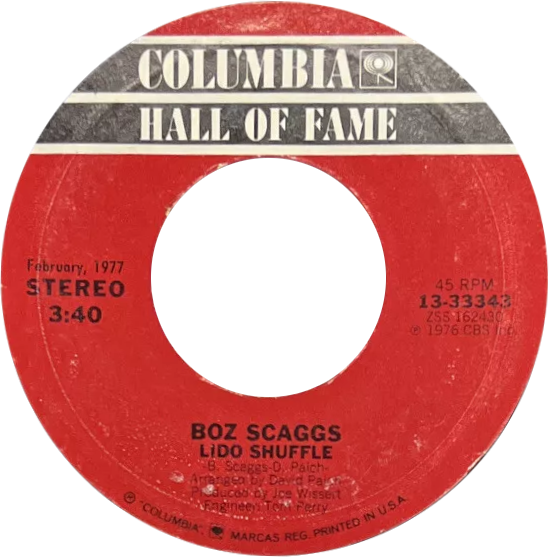
- A US vinyl reissue

Single by Boz Scaggs

from the album Silk Degrees
- B-side: "We're All Alone"
- Released: February 1977 (USA); 15 April 1977 (UK)
- Recorded: September 1975
- Genre: R&B; blue-eyed soul; pop rock
- Length: 3:40
- Label: CBS
- Songwriters: Boz Scaggs, David Paich
- Producer: Joe Wissert

Boz Scaggs singles chronology
"What Can I Say" (1976)	"Lido Shuffle" (1977)	"Hollywood" (1978)

Official audio
- "Lido Shuffle" on YouTube

"Lido Shuffle" is a song written by Boz Scaggs and David Paich and introduced on the 1976 album Silk Degrees. The story of a wandering hustler, gambler, and drifter who is on the run after trying to pull off one last high-stakes job, it was released as a single in 1977 and was produced by Joe Wissert.

== Background ==
Scaggs recalled: "'Lido Shuffle’ was a song that I'd been banging around. I...took the idea of the shuffle [from] a song that Fats Domino did called 'The Fat Man' that had a kind of driving shuffle beat that I used to play on the piano, and I just started kind of singing along with it. Then I showed it to [David] Paich and he helped me fill it out. It ended up being 'Lido Shuffle.'"

Members of the backup band on "Lido Shuffle" include David Paich, Jeff Porcaro and David Hungate, who later formed Toto.

== Reception ==
Released as the album's fourth single, "Lido Shuffle" reached number 11 in the US and 13 on the UK Singles Chart. In Australia the track spent three weeks at number 2 as a double A-side hit with "What Can I Say".

The song was adopted by the Philadelphia Eagles to play when cornerback Lito Sheppard would make an interception.

== Chart performance ==
=== Weekly charts ===
Chart (1977–1978)	Peak position
Australia (Kent Music Report)	2
Canada RPM Top Singles	5
New Zealand (RIANZ)	18
UK	13
US Billboard Hot 100	11
US Cash Box Top 100	6

=== Year-end charts ===
Chart (1977)	Rank
Australia	12
Canada	66
US Billboard Hot 100	74
US Cash Box	78

== Certifications ==
Region	Certification	Certified units/sales
New Zealand (RMNZ)	Platinum	30,000^{‡}
United States (RIAA)	Platinum	1,000,000^{‡}
^{‡} Sales+streaming figures based on certification alone.

== Personnel ==
- Boz Scaggs – vocals, guitar
- David Paich – acoustic piano, Hammond organ, Minimoog, Moog synthesizer
- Fred Tackett – guitar
- Louis Shelton – guitar
- David Hungate – bass
- Jeff Porcaro – drums
- Vincent DeRosa – horns
- Jim Horn – horns
- Tony Terran – horns
- Paul Hubinon – horns
- Dick Hyde – horns
- Plas Johnson – horns
- Tom Scott – horns
- Bud Shank – horns
