= Watershed district (Minnesota) =

Watershed districts are special government entities in the U.S. state of Minnesota that monitor and regulate the use of water in watersheds surrounding various lakes and rivers in the state. The districts cover the natural regions of the watersheds, rather than politically defined regions and thus may have boundaries that cross jurisdictions. They are run by a board of managers, who are appointed by commissions in the counties within the districts.

The districts were first authorized by Minnesota state legislation in 1955. As of November 2016 there are 45 districts in the state. District boards coordinate activities with the state, as well as with the counties, cities, and soil and water conservation districts within the watershed districts. In comparison with public bodies in other countries, watershed districts are most similar to the internal drainage boards of England and Wales, Waterschappen of the Netherlands, and Consorzi di bonifica e irrigazione of Italy.

== List of current watershed districts in Minnesota ==
- Bear Valley Watershed District
- Belle Creek Watershed District
- Bois de Sioux Watershed District
- Browns Creek Watershed District
- Buffalo Creek Watershed District
- Buffalo-Red River Watershed District
- Capitol Region Watershed District
- Carnelian-Marine Watershed District
- Cedar River Watershed District
- Clearwater River Watershed District
- Comfort Lake-Forest Lake Watershed District
- Coon Creek Watershed District
- Cormorant Lakes Watershed District
- Crooked Creek Watershed District
- Heron Lake Watershed District
- High Island Creek Watershed District
- Joe River Watershed District
- Kanaranzi-Little Rock Watershed District
- Lac qui Parle-Yellow Bank Watershed District
- Lower Minnesota River Watershed District
- Middle Fork Crow River Watershed District
- Middle-Snake-Tamarac Rivers Watershed District
- Minnehaha Creek Watershed District
- Nine Mile Creek Watershed District
- North Fork Crow River Watershed District
- Okabena-Ocheda Watershed District
- Pelican River Watershed District
- Prior Lake-Spring Lake Watershed District
- Ramsey-Washington Metro Watershed District
- Red Lake Watershed District
- Rice Creek Watershed District
- Riley-Purgatory-Bluff Creek Watershed District
- Roseau River Watershed District
- Sand Hill River Watershed District
- Sauk River Watershed District
- Shell Rock River Watershed District
- South Washington Watershed District
- Stockton-Rollingstone Watershed District
- Turtle Creek Watershed District
- Two Rivers Watershed District
- Upper Minnesota River Watershed District
- Valley Branch Watershed District
- Warroad Watershed District
- Wild Rice Watershed District
- Yellow Medicine River Watershed District
