= LeRoux =

American rock band

- Also known as: Jeff Pollard Band; Louisiana's LeRoux; The Levee Band
- Origin: Louisiana, U.S.
- Genres: Southern rock; pop rock
- Years active: 1978–1984, 1985–present
- Labels: Capitol, RCA
- Members: Joey Decker; Rod Roddy; Jim Odom; Nelson Blanchard; Mark Duthu; Randy Carpenter; Jeff McCarty
- Past members: Terry Brock; Tony Haseldon; Bobby Campo; Leon Medica; David Peters; Jeff Pollard; Fergie Frederiksen; Randy Knapps; Steve Brewster; Courtney Westbrook; Keith Landry; Boo Pourciau
- Website: Official website

LeRoux (also known as Louisiana's LeRoux) is a band founded in Baton Rouge, Louisiana, which saw its heyday from 1978 to 1984. Their best-known songs were "Take a Ride On a Riverboat" with its 4-part a capella intro, the regional smash "New Orleans Ladies", "Nobody Said It Was Easy (Lookin' for the Lights)" (their highest-charting single), "Addicted" and "Carrie's Gone".

Since reforming in 1985, the band has continued to perform live throughout the U.S., mostly at fairs and festivals in the Louisiana area.

== Band history ==
=== Rise to fame (1977–1984) ===
In 1977 several former members of a group called the Levee Band, who had been playing as studio players in the Bayou-located Studio in the Country and as backup for local artists like Clarence "Gatemouth" Brown and Clifton Chenier, signed a deal with Capitol Records as The Jeff Pollard Band. The band had just returned from touring the United States and Africa with Brown through an arrangement with the US State Department. Leon Medica, the band's producer and bassist, had presented a demo tape to Paul Tannen at Screen Gems-EMI while doing a session in Nashville and making trips to Colorado to contribute bass parts to a Nitty Gritty Dirt Band album at William McEuen's Aspen Recording Society studios. McEuen, Tannen and Attorney John Frankenheimer helped Medica secure the contract with Capitol.

By early 1978, they had changed their name to Louisiana's LeRoux, which refers to roux, a Cajun gravy base used to make gumbo. The band was originally composed of Jeff Pollard (vocals, guitar), David Peters (drums, percussion, backing vocals), Leon Medica (bass, backing vocals), Tony Haselden (vocals, guitar), Rod Roddy (vocals, keyboards, synthesizers) and Bobby Campo (horns, percussion, violin, backing vocals). All of the songs on their self-titled 1978 debut album were sung and written by Pollard, except "New Orleans Ladies", which was written by Hoyt Garrick with a contribution by Medica. It reached No. 59 on the Billboard Hot 100 in the summer of 1978. Two more albums followed (Keep the Fire Burnin' in June 1979 and Up in June 1980), but after neither was able to expand the band's fan base, they were dropped by Capitol.

During the height of their popularity, LeRoux performed on Solid Gold, The Midnight Special and Don Kirshner's Rock Concert (the late-night television music shows that were popular at that time). They also appeared with many classic rock bands, including: The Allman Brothers Band, Wet Willie, Journey, Kansas, Heart, The Doobie Brothers, Charlie Daniels Band, Foreigner, Marshall Tucker Band, Outlaws, ZZ Top and more.

Starting with the Jai Winding-produced Up, they moved away from their more funky R&B sound towards a more late-70s/early-80s album-oriented rock style and dropped "Louisiana's" from their name, becoming simply "LeRoux". In 1981 they signed with RCA and issued their fourth LP, Last Safe Place (January 1982), which became their highest-charting album. The album spawned three charting Billboard singles in 1982: "Addicted" (No. 7 Mainstream Rock), "Nobody Said It Was Easy (Lookin' for the Lights)" (No. 18 Hot 100) and "Last Safe Place on Earth" (No. 77 Hot 100).

Other changes were in store as Campo and Pollard both quit later that year, with the former returning to school to complete his master's degree in music and the latter renouncing rock music to enter the Baptist Christian ministry, where he remains today. Former Trillion singer Fergie Frederiksen and guitarist Jim Odom (a local native, who had just attended Berklee College of Music) came on board in the summer of 1982, taking over for Pollard on the fifth album, So Fired Up (which was released in February 1983). The album contained the minor-charting "Carrie's Gone" (No. 81 Hot 100), which Odom and Frederiksen had written after Frederiksen's breakup with actress Carrie Hamilton, Carol Burnett's daughter. The music video for the album's second single "Lifeline" also received MTV rotation, and was covered by Bobby and the Midnites and Uriah Heep. "Wait One Minute", another song from this album, was widely aired and favored by fans. Some young people know the band mainly for this beautiful ballad.

It wasn't enough to keep them from being dropped by RCA, however, and the band called it quits by 1984. Frederiksen, who had already been working with another project called Abandon Shame, then stepped in to replace (former Levee Band member) Bobby Kimball in the band Toto.

=== Later years (1985-present) ===
In March 1985 Leon Medica and Tony Haselden were part of a USO organized traveling rock outfit that entertained US military troops in Europe, called 1st Airborne Division Rock and Roll. Later in 1985, most of the band (sans Pollard & Frederiksen) got back together to do annual concerts in and around New Orleans with new singer Randy Knapps. Peters and Odom were also part of the group Network, who recorded the song "Back in America" for the movie European Vacation that came out that same year.

Medica and Knapps were part of another edition of 1st Airborne Division Rock and Roll that went to the Indian Ocean and Europe in September through October 1986.

And after releasing a greatest hits compilation entitled Bayou Degradable: The Best of Louisiana's LeRoux in July 1996, the band decided to play more live shows in the southern U.S. and along the Gulf Coast and have been doing so ever since.

By 1997, new members Kenneth J. "Boo" Pourciau (drums, backing vocals), Nelson Blanchard (keyboards, backing vocals) and Steve Brewster (percussion) came in to sub for Peters, Roddy and Campo, whenever the increased tour schedule conflicted with their other duties. Shortly thereafter, Campo left the band again and Mark Duthu replaced Brewster later that year.

In 2000 the newer members appeared alongside Knapps, Haselden, Medica, Peters, Odom and Roddy on a new release, Ain't Nothing but a Gris Gris. The CD, which was a return to the funkier sound of the band's first two albums, featured ten tracks – "all written or co-written by members of LeRoux", according to the back cover. The CD was produced by Medica with Odom credited as an Associate Producer. The group had also hoped to bring back Fergie Frederiksen to do another album that was more in step with the early 80s album-oriented rock sound of their 1983 release So Fired Up, but it never came to pass and Frederiksen died from liver cancer on January 18, 2014 at his home in Mound, Minnesota.

Knapps left the group at the end of 2005 and Courtney Westbrook was lead singer in 2006 before Terry Brock (formerly of Network) took over in 2007. After the group's heyday, guitarist Tony Haselden became a Nashville songwriter in the late-1980s and penned the country hits "It Ain't Nothin'" for the late Keith Whitley, "That's My Story" for Collin Raye, "Mama Knows" for the group Shenandoah and many others. Bassist and producer Leon Medica resided in Nashville for many years and was in high demand as a studio musician and songwriter.

Members of LeRoux backed up Tab Benoit on his Brother to the Blues and Power of the Ponchartrain CDs, recorded a live DVD and CD in Nashville with Tab in early May 2007 and toured nationwide with him in 2007 and 2008. On October 10, 2009, during their performance at Tab Benoit's "Voice of the Wetlands" Festival in Houma, Louisiana, LeRoux was inducted into the Louisiana Music Hall of Fame as their 50th inductee.

In 2010 Terry Brock was replaced as lead singer by Keith Landry and David Peters was replaced by new drummer Randy Carpenter. LeRoux went back into Dockside Studio in May 2011 to record basic tracks for an album slated for release in 2012. This project included such diverse vocalists and musicians as Bobby Kimball, Steve Cropper, Jimmy Hall and Sonny Landreth, but was never released since the group felt the tracks "lacked chemistry."

At the end of 2014, Leon Medica retired from live performing when he was diagnosed with Alzheimer’s disease. His place onstage in LeRoux has been assumed by new bassist Joey Decker. In early 2016, Terry Brock returned as the band's lead singer for another two years. In March 2018, after Brock once again departed, Jeff McCarty was announced as LeRoux's new lead singer. Right around the same time, the group began work on a new album with producer Jeff Glixman. This album, One of Those Days, was released in June 2020.

Leon Medica succumbed to Alzheimer’s and died on June 9, 2024 at the age of 78. And after being sidelined from the band due to illness, Tony Haseldon also passed on May 16, 2025 at age 79.

== Personnel ==
=== Members ===
Current members

- Rod Roddy – vocals, keyboards, synthesizers (1978–1984, 1985–present)
- Jim Odom – guitars, backing vocals (1982–1984, 1985–present)
- Nelson Blanchard – keyboards, backing vocals (1997–present)
- Mark Duthu – percussion (1997–present)
- Randy Carpenter – drums (2010–present)
- Jeff McCarty – vocals (2018–present)
- Joey Decker – bass, backing vocals (2014–present)

Former members

- Tony Haselden – vocals, guitars (1978–1984, 1985–2025)
- Leon Medica – bass, backing vocals (1978–1984, 1985–2014)
- David Peters – drums, percussion, backing vocals (1978–1984, 1985–2010)
- Bobby Campo – horns, percussion, violin, backing vocals (1978–1982, 1985–1997)
- Boo Pourciau – drums, backing vocals (1997–2003; died 2003)
- Jeff Pollard – vocals, guitars (1978–1982)
- Fergie Frederiksen – vocals (1982–1984; died 2014)
- Randy Knapps – vocals (1985–2005)
- Steve Brewster - percussion (1997)
- Courtney Westbrook – vocals (2006–2007)
- Terry Brock – vocals (2007–2010, 2016-2018)
- Keith Landry – vocals (2010–2016)

=== Lineups ===
1978–1982	1982–1984	1984–1985	1985–1997
Bobby Campo – horns, percussion, violin, backing vocals; Tony Haselden – vocals, guitars; Leon Medica – bass, backing vocals; David Peters – drums, percussion; Jeff Pollard – vocals, guitars; Rod Roddy – vocals, keyboards	Tony Haselden – vocals, guitars; Leon Medica – bass, backing vocals; David Peters – drums, percussion; Rod Roddy – vocals, keyboards, synthesizers; Fergie Frederiksen – vocals; Jim Odom – guitars, backing vocals	Disbanded	Tony Haselden – vocals, guitars; Leon Medica – bass, backing vocals; David Peters – drums, percussion; Rod Roddy – vocals, keyboards, synthesizers; Jim Odom – guitars, backing vocals; Randy Knapps – vocals
1997	1997–1999	1999–2005	2006–2007
Tony Haselden – vocals, guitars; Leon Medica – bass, backing vocals; David Peters – drums, percussion; Rod Roddy – vocals, keyboards, synthesizers; Jim Odom – guitars, backing vocals; Bobby Campo – horns, percussion, violin, backing vocals; Randy Knapps – vocals; Nelson Blanchard – keyboards, backing vocals; Mark Duthu – percussion; Boo Pourciau – drums, backing vocals	Tony Haselden – vocals, guitars; Leon Medica – bass, backing vocals; David Peters – drums, percussion; Rod Roddy – vocals, keyboards, synthesizers; Jim Odom – guitars, backing vocals; Randy Knapps – vocals; Nelson Blanchard – keyboards, backing vocals; Boo Pourciau – drums, backing vocals; Mark Duthu – percussion	Tony Haselden – vocals, guitars; Leon Medica – bass, backing vocals; David Peters – drums, percussion; Rod Roddy – vocals, keyboards, synthesizers; Jim Odom – guitars, backing vocals; Randy Knapps – vocals; Nelson Blanchard – keyboards, backing vocals; Boo Pourciau – drums, backing vocals (died in 2003); Mark Duthu – percussion	Tony Haselden – vocals, guitars; Leon Medica – bass, backing vocals; David Peters – drums, percussion; Rod Roddy – vocals, keyboards, synthesizers; Jim Odom – guitars, backing vocals; Nelson Blanchard – keyboards, backing vocals; Mark Duthu – percussion; Courtney Westbrook – vocals
2007–2010	2010–2014	2014–2016	2016–2018
Tony Haselden – vocals, guitars; Leon Medica – bass, backing vocals; David Peters – drums, percussion; Rod Roddy – vocals, keyboards, synthesizers; Jim Odom – guitars, backing vocals; Nelson Blanchard – keyboards, backing vocals; Mark Duthu – percussion; Terry Brock – vocals	Tony Haselden – vocals, guitars; Leon Medica – bass, backing vocals; Rod Roddy – vocals, keyboards, synthesizers; Jim Odom – guitars, backing vocals; Nelson Blanchard – keyboards, backing vocals; Mark Duthu – percussion; Randy Carpenter – drums; Keith Landry – vocals	Tony Haselden – vocals, guitars; Rod Roddy – vocals, keyboards, synthesizers; Jim Odom – guitars, backing vocals; Nelson Blanchard – keyboards, backing vocals; Mark Duthu – percussion; Randy Carpenter – drums; Keith Landry – vocals; Joey Decker - bass, backing vocals	Tony Haselden – vocals, guitars; Rod Roddy – vocals, keyboards, synthesizers; Jim Odom – guitars, backing vocals; Nelson Blanchard – keyboards, backing vocals; Mark Duthu – percussion; Randy Carpenter – drums; Terry Brock – vocals (replaced by Jeff McCarty in 2018); Joey Decker – bass, backing vocals

== Discography ==
=== Albums ===
Year	Album details	Chart positions
Year	Album details	US
1978	Louisiana's Le Roux	135
1979	Keep the Fire Burnin'	162
1980	Up	145
1982	Last Safe Place	64
1983	So Fired Up	—
2000	Ain't Nothing but a Gris Gris	—
2002	Higher Up	—
2020	One of Those Days	-

=== Singles ===
Year	Title	Chart positions		Album
Year	Title	US	US Rock	Album
1978	"New Orleans Ladies"	59	—	Louisiana's Le Roux
1978	"Take a Ride on a Riverboat"	109	—	Louisiana's Le Roux
1979	"Feel It"	—	—	Keep the Fire Burnin'
1980	"Let Me Be Your Fantasy"	105	—	Up
1980	"Roll Away the Stone"	—	—	Up
1982	"Addicted"	—	7	Last Safe Place
1982	"The Last Safe Place on Earth"	77	—	Last Safe Place
1982	"Nobody Said It Was Easy"	18	—	Last Safe Place
1983	"Carrie's Gone"	81	—	So Fired Up
"—" denotes a recording that did not chart or was not released in that territory.
