= Dutch Lake =

Lake in the state of Minnesota, United States

- Location within Minnesota
- Location: Mound / Minnetrista, Minnesota, United States
- Coordinates: 44°56′36.8″N 93°40′50.9″W
- Primary outflows: Slow Creek
- Basin countries: United States
- Surface area: 160 acres (64.75 ha)
- Average depth: 15.15 ft (4.62 m)
- Max. depth: 45 ft (14 m)
- Surface elevation: 937 ft (286 m)
- Settlements: Mound

Dutch Lake is a lake located in the state of Minnesota. It was named for its early German population. It is a 159.50 acres (64.5474 ha) acre lake that is west-southwest of Minneapolis-St. Paul in the Minneapolis suburb of Mound and Minnetrista. It has an average depth of 15.15 feet (4.62 m) and a maximum depth of 45 ft (14 m). Slow Creek, its un-navigable outflow is on its northeast shore. It connects the lake to Lake Minnetonka. It is home to a variety of fish including Black, Yellow, and Brown Bullhead, Black Crappie, Bluegill, Hybrid Sunfish, Largemouth Bass, Northern Pike, Pumpkinseed Sunfish, and Yellow Perch. Much of the Northern shore is owned by Camp Christmas Tree summer day camp.
