= Christopher O'Malley =

Current president and CEO of LogRythm

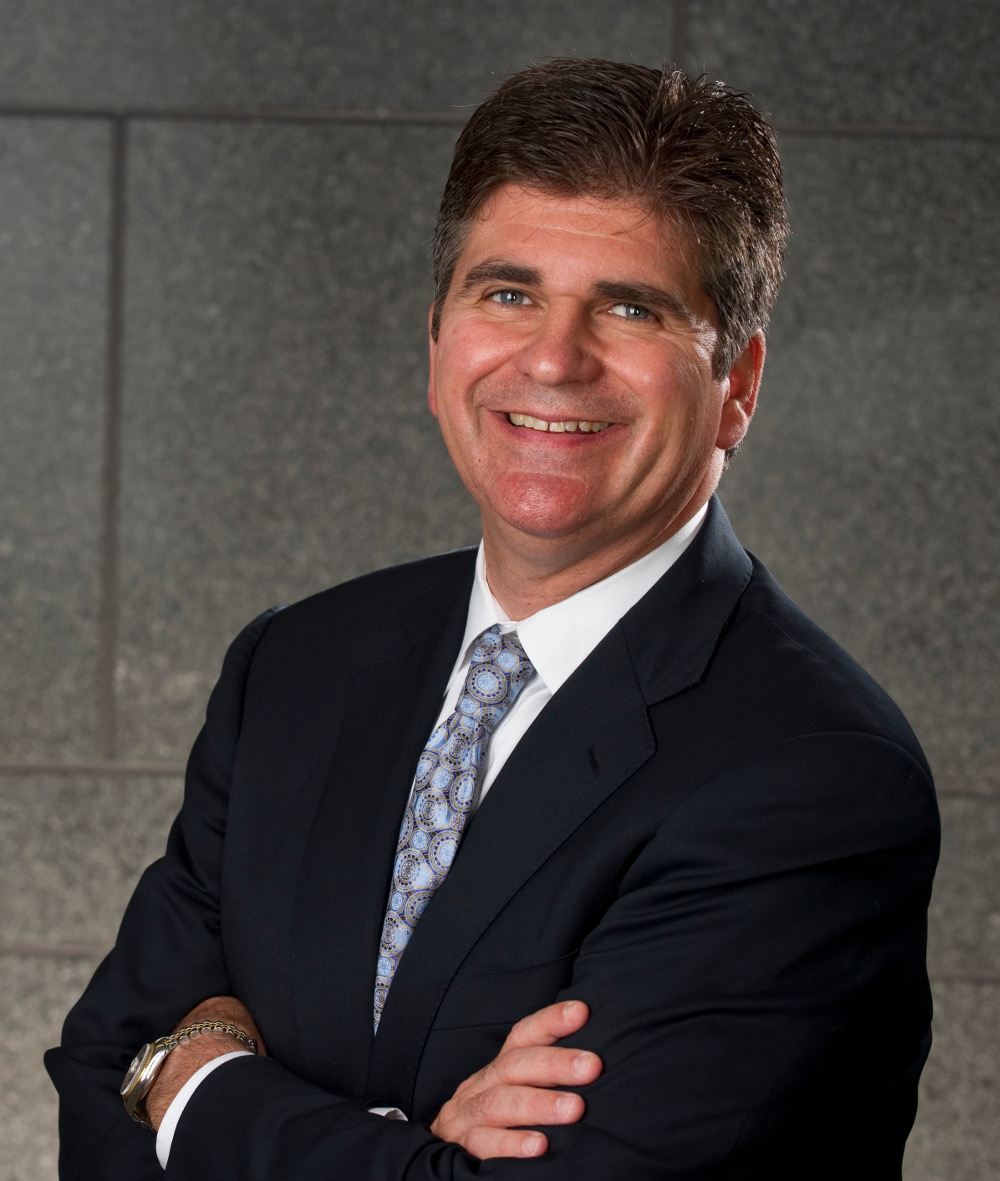
- Born: January 24, 1963 (age 63); Mound, Minnesota, US
- Education: University of Minnesota-Twin Cities
- Occupations: Former President and CEO of Compuware, LogRhythm, and Exabeam

Christopher O'Malley (born January 24, 1963) is an American software executive and former President and CEO of several software companies, including Compuware, LogRhythm, and Exabeam.

== Career ==
In October 2025, Christopher O'Malley retired after nearly four decades of executive leadership.

O'Malley led the merger of LogRhythm and Exabeam completed in July 2024, combining to form the leader security operations market leader in Behavior Intelligence for the agentic enterprise. operating under the Exabeam name. Following the merger, O'Malley became President and CEO of the combined company.

O'Malley became President and CEO of LogRhythm in February 2022. Since his appointment, LogRhythm has introduced a quarterly cadence of innovation delivery under the theme, "Promises Made. Promises Kept." which including the release of Axon, a cloud-native security operations platform. The Colorado Technology Association gave LogRhythm their 2023 Company of the Year Award.

O’Malley was formerly president and CEO of Compuware Corporation, a software company headquartered in Detroit, Michigan, in December 2014 after being its president of mainframe operations for six months. His nomination came soon after the acquisition of the company by Thoma Bravo for $2.5 billion and its split of the mainframe business into a new company. O'Malley led the turnaround of Compuware and the introduction of tools to enable Agile and DevOps on the mainframe. In March 2020, Compuware was acquired by BMC Software. He was best known for his advocacy of the mainframe platform, as well as enabling Agile software development, DevOps toolchains and value stream methods in managing the mainframe.

O'Malley has held senior management and board member positions in a number of IT companies, including LogRhythm (October 2021 – Present), Greenphire (October 2021 – Present), Compuware (December 2014 - 2020), Bluenog (December 2009 – March 2016), Nimsoft, Inc. (April 2011 - July 2012), YJT Solutions (July 2012 - March 2015), and VelociData, Inc. (September 2012 – July 2015). He has also founded Christopher Ventures LLC established in July 2012.

From October 1988 to July 2012, O'Malley was at CA, Inc.

O'Malley has been interviewed on Bloomberg national radio and by The Wall Street Journal for his thought leadership within IT and is an interviewee and contributor of podcasts, articles and columns to technology, business and government focused publications. O'Malley was one of the top 50 names to know in IT by Crain's Detroit Business in 2017, named best DevOps evangelist by DevOps.com in 2019, and one of the Top 25 Government IT Executives of 2020 by IT Services Report, and selected by Sigma Chi fraternity as a Significant Sig in 2017.

O'Malley is the founder & board member of the O'Malley Foundation, a charitable organization established in 1998 that grants college scholarships, supports youth arts programs, local charities and Catholic charities.
