= Lowdown (Boz Scaggs song) =

1976 single by Boz Scaggs

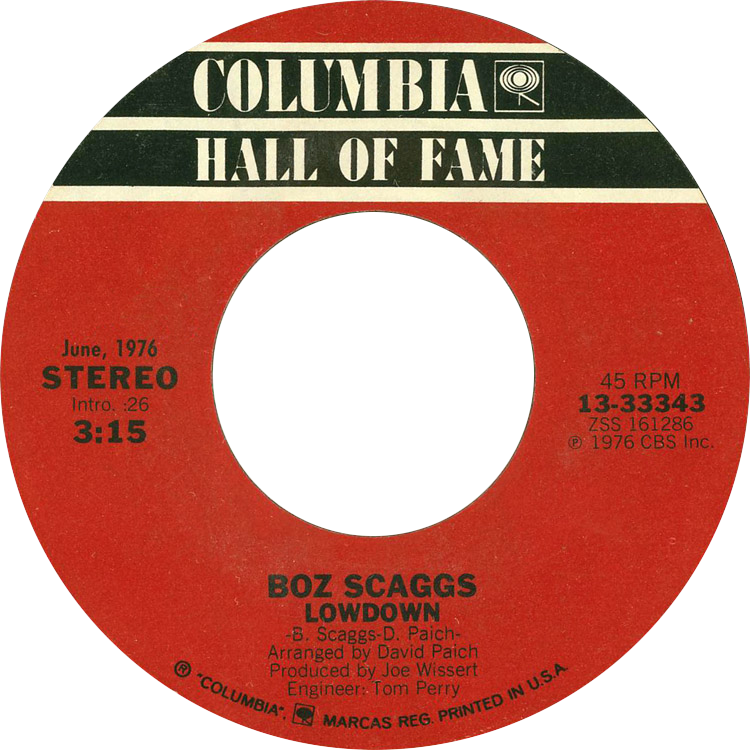
- A US vinyl reissue

Single by Boz Scaggs

from the album Silk Degrees
- B-side: "Harbor Lights"
- Released: June 1976
- Genre: Disco; soft rock; blue-eyed soul; yacht rock; pop rock; funk
- Length: 3:14 (single version); 5:16 (album version)
- Label: Columbia
- Songwriters: Boz Scaggs; David Paich
- Producer: Joe Wissert

Official Audio
- "Lowdown" on YouTube

"Lowdown" is a song originally recorded in 1976 by Boz Scaggs for his album Silk Degrees. The song was co-written by Scaggs and keyboardist David Paich. Paich, along with fellow "Lowdown" session musicians David Hungate (bass) and Jeff Porcaro (drums), would later go on to form the band Toto. Produced by Joe Wissert, it was released in June 1976 on the Columbia label.

The "unplanned" guitar solo is by Louis Shelton, played with a Fender Telecaster through a '69 Fender Princeton Reverb amp and an inexpensive basic Boss distortion pedal. Minimoog and ARP synthesizer are played by David Paich and the prominent bass by David Hungate.

== Release and reaction ==
Initially, Silk Degrees received a lukewarm commercial response; the first single released from the album, "It's Over", barely cracked the Top 40 in the United States, peaking at number 38. One day, however, a Cleveland R&B radio DJ began playing "Lowdown" straight off the album; public response was very positive and soon Columbia Records sent the song to other R&B radio stations for airplay.

The song soon entered rotation on Top 40 stations as well, and when it was officially released as a single, it became Scaggs's first major hit, reaching number 1 on the Cash Box Top 100 and number 3 on the Billboard Hot 100. It was also successful on the R&B and disco charts, peaking at number 5 on both. The song was also a major hit in Canada, peaking at number 2. It was a minor hit in the UK, topping out at number 28 on the chart.

Scaggs is quoted as saying that the success of "Lowdown" was "an accident" and that, even though it was their favorite from Silk Degrees, he and the others involved in the making of the song thought there "wasn't a chance in hell" that it would be released as a single. The single was certified Gold by the RIAA for sales of one million copies and would go on to win the Grammy Award for Best R&B Song at the 19th Annual Grammy Awards in 1977.

== Renditions ==
- In 1996, Scaggs recorded an unplugged jazz version for his Fade into Light album.
- In 2020, the English band Disclosure sampled "Lowdown" for their track "Expressing What Matters".

== Personnel ==
The Silk Degrees album liner notes name the band members and the horn players in general. Additional credits for the song "Lowdown" are specified as follows:

- Louis Shelton – guitar
- David Hungate – bass
- Jeff Porcaro – drums
- David Paich – ARP synthesizer, Minimoog
- Jim Gilstrap – backing vocals
- Augie Johnson – backing vocals
- Marty McCall – backing vocals
- Carolyn Willis – backing vocals

== Charts ==
=== Weekly charts ===
Chart (1976/1977)	Peak position
Australia (Kent Music Report)	54
Canada Top Singles (RPM)	2
Canada RPM Adult Contemporary	7
New Zealand (RIANZ)	35
UK Singles (Official Charts)	28
US Billboard Hot 100	3
US Billboard Easy Listening	11
US Hot R&B/Hip-Hop Songs (Billboard)	5
US Cash Box Top 100	1

=== Year-end charts ===
Chart (1976)	Rank
Canada RPM Top Singles	43
US Billboard	49

== Certifications ==
Region	Certification	Certified units/sales
New Zealand (RMNZ)	Gold	15,000^{‡}
United States (RIAA)	2× Platinum	2,000,000^{‡}
^{‡} Sales+streaming figures based on certification alone.
