= Exabeam =

American cybersecurity company

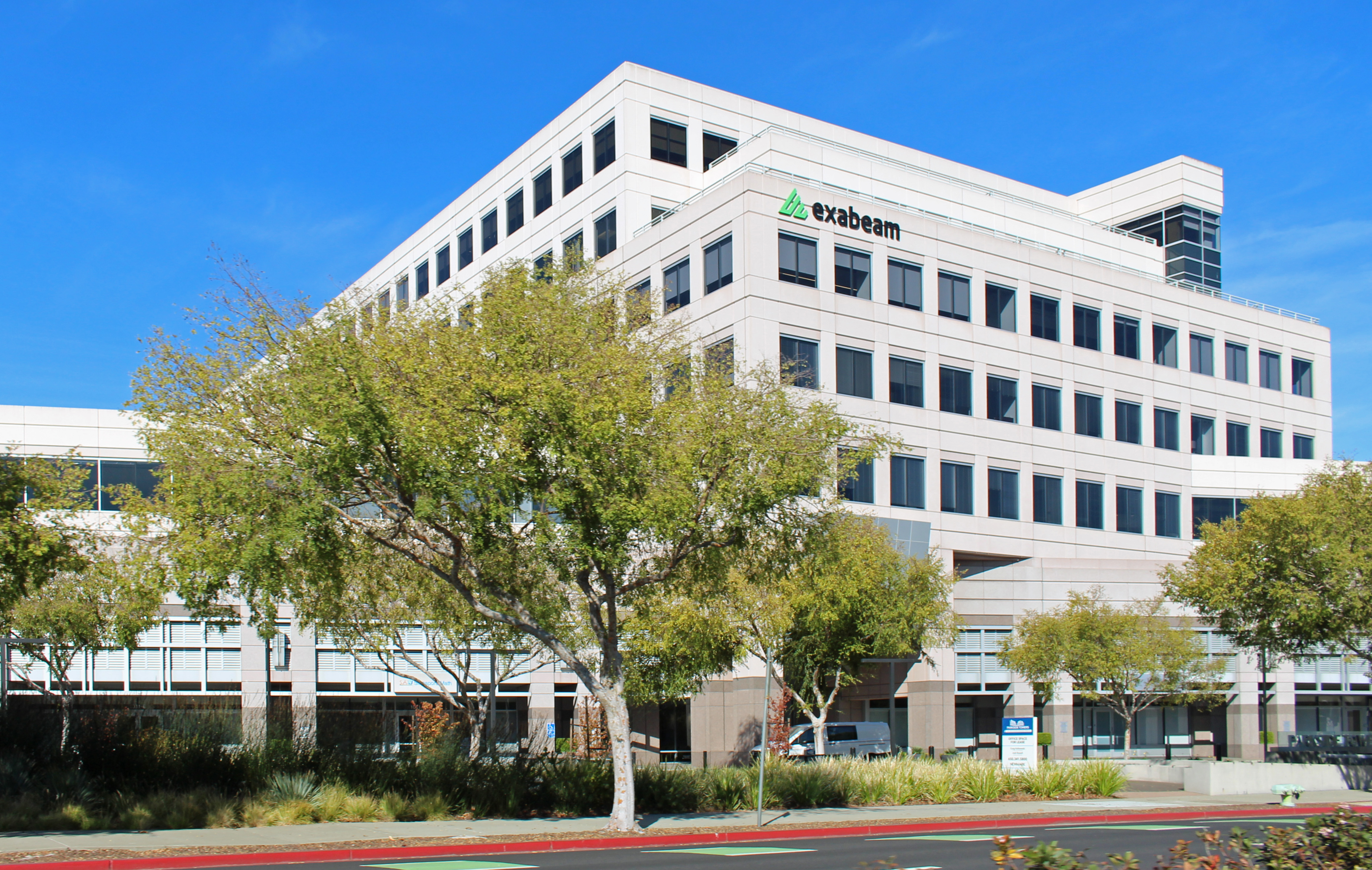
- Exabeam headquarters in Foster City, California
- Industry: Information security
- Founded: 2013; 13 years ago
- Founder: Nir Polak, Domingo Mihovilovic, and Sylvain Gil
- Headquarters: Foster City, California
- Key people: Pete Harteveld (CEO)
- Website: www.exabeam.com

Exabeam is a global cybersecurity company headquartered in Foster City, California. In 2021 it joined the Snowflake Inc. data services platform and achieved unicorn status with over $2B valuation.

== History ==
Exabeam was founded in 2013 while its software was developed by programmers from Imperva, Sumo Logic, HP ArcSight, and Splunk. On June 10, 2014, Exabeam raised $10 million. In September 2015, EXABEAM raised $25 million in a Series B venture round led by Icon Ventures. In June, the company launched Analytics for Ransomware, app designed for early detection of ransomware infections across the corporate network. In 2017, Exabeam raised $30 million, $50 million 2018, and $75 million in 2019.

In May 2019, the company partnered with Deakin University to develop a cybersecurity degree program. On July 2, Exabeam bought Israeli cloud security firm SkyFormation. In January 2021, the company joined the cybersecurity ecosystem Snowflake Inc. data services platform. Exabeam achieved $2.4 billion valuation, following its announcement of a $200 million Series F funding round in June.

In 2020, Forrester Research featured Exabeam in its Security Analytics Platforms, Q4 2020 report. Former Forescout CEO Michael DeCesare became the second CEO of Exabeam on June 1, 2021, as announced by Reuters.

In May 2024, LogRhythm announced a planned merger with Exabeam; while the financial terms were not announced, Exabeam's most recent valuation was $2.5 billion. The merger was finalized in July 2024, with Christopher O'Malley, former CEO of LogRhythm, named as the CEO of the newly combined company operating under the Exabeam name.

In October 2025, Exabeam announced Pete Harteveld as Chief Executive Officer. The leadership transition follows the decision by Chris O’Malley to step into retirement after three years of dedicated service to the company and over 30 years of executive leadership.

== See also ==
- List of California companies
