= Nobody Said It Was Easy =

1982 single by LeRoux

Single by LeRoux

from the album Last Safe Place
- B-side: "Can't You See It In My Eyes"
- Released: 1982
- Studio: Studio in the Country
- Genre: Hard rock
- Length: 3:30 (single version); 4:11 (album version)
- Label: RCA
- Songwriter: Tony Haselden
- Producer: Leon Medica

LeRoux singles chronology
"The Last Safe Place On Earth" (1982)	"Nobody Said It Was Easy" (1982)	"Carrie's Gone" (1983)

"Nobody Said It Was Easy (Lookin' For The Lights)" is a song by American rock band LeRoux. It was released as a single in 1982 from their album Last Safe Place.

The song peaked at No. 18 on the Billboard Hot 100, becoming the band's only top 40 hit.

== Chart performance ==
Chart (1982)	Peak position
U.S. Billboard Hot 100	18

== See also ==
- List of one-hit wonders in the United States
