= David Paich =

American musician (born 1954)

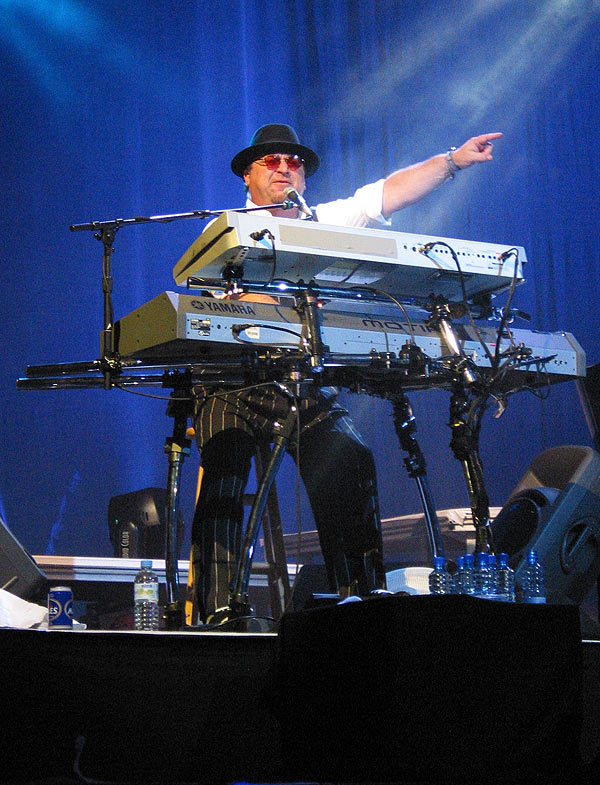
- Paich performing in 2003

Background information
- Born: David Frank Paich; June 25, 1954 (age 72); Los Angeles, California, U.S.
- Genres: Pop rock; jazz fusion; adult contemporary; blue-eyed soul
- Occupations: Musician; songwriter; singer; musical director; record producer
- Instruments: Keyboards; synthesizers; vocals
- Years active: 1973–present
- Label: Mascot
- Member of: Toto
- Spouse: Lorraine Doherty (m. 1984)
- Website: davidpaich.com

David Frank Paich (born June 25, 1954) is an American keyboardist, singer, and songwriter, best known as the co-founder, principal songwriter, keyboardist, and secondary vocalist of the rock band Toto since 1977. He wrote or co-wrote much of Toto's original material, including the band's three most popular songs: "Hold the Line", "Rosanna", and "Africa". With Toto, Paich has contributed to 17 albums and sold over 40 million records. He and guitarist and singer Steve Lukather are the only official members to appear on every studio album. (Note: Steve Porcaro contributed to every studio album as well, but was not an official member of the band from 1987 to 2010.)

In addition, Paich has worked as a songwriter, session musician, and producer with a host of artists including Boz Scaggs, Cheryl Lynn, George Benson, Helen Reddy, Andy Williams, and Michael Jackson.

Paich is the son of jazz composer, musician, and arranger Marty Paich.

== Career ==
=== Toto ===
A prolific writer of chart-performing songs (13 Top 40 hits on the Billboard Hot 100), Paich wrote or co-wrote such tracks as "Miss Sun" (1980), "Got To Be Real" (1978), "Georgy Porgy" (1978), "99" (1979), "Lowdown" (1976), "What Can I Say" (1976), "Lido Shuffle" (1976), "Lady Love Me (One More Time)" (George Benson), "Hold the Line" (1978), "It's Over" (1976), "Rosanna", "Hydra", and "Pamela". He also performed lead vocals on the Toto hits "Africa", "Holyanna", and "Stranger in Town".

Paich remained with Toto from the beginning of the band in 1977 until 2004, then performed on only a few shows until their disbandment in 2008. Session keyboardist Greg Phillinganes joined Toto in 2003 as an additional keyboardist for both studio projects and tour dates. In 2010, Paich resumed performing with Toto, and until mid-2018 was one of the band's keyboard players, alongside fellow original member Steve Porcaro.

With Toto in between legs of its 2018 40 Trips Around the Sun (40th anniversary) tour, the band announced via its official website on July 20, 2018, that Paich "will not be performing on the band's planned North American tour [lasting from July 30 – November 17]. The recent European appearances [February 11 – April 8] took a toll on his personal well-being... He plans on focusing on his health, and looks forward to returning to the road when ready to do so." Guitarist Steve Lukather later stated that Paich's absence stemmed partially from an apparent seizure he suffered on the bus during the band's early 2018 European tour.

Paich returned to the stage with Toto for the opening and closing shows of their 2019 US tour, reportedly their last, on September 20 in Los Angeles and October 20 in Philadelphia. In both instances, Paich joined the band at the end of the show to play keyboards and sing on "Africa" and "Home of the Brave". The band dissolved at the end of the tour, however, before he could make a full return. Toto reformed in 2020 with Lukather and singer Joseph Williams fronting a new band. Paich is no longer able to tour full-time, but remains a member of the band as its musical director and a guest performer whenever his health allows. He made a guest appearance in Amsterdam, on July 15, 2022, for five songs.

=== Session and side projects ===
He has co-writing credits with Boz Scaggs on the songs "What Can I Say", "Lowdown", and "Lido Shuffle" from the multi-platinum album Silk Degrees, and occasionally still sits in on keyboards with Boz Scaggs' band. As songwriter he wrote or co-wrote songs for Cher, The Jacksons, Andy Williams, George Benson, Glen Campbell, Boz Scaggs, Jon Anderson (Yes), Cherie & Marie Currie, and Chicago. As arranger he worked for Michael Jackson, Rod Stewart, Patti Austin, Donna Summer, the Doobie Brothers, Sheryl Crow and many more.

In 1977, Paich produced the No. 1 R&B hit "Break It to Me Gently" by Aretha Franklin. In the early and mid-1980s, Paich often worked with well-known producers Quincy Jones and David Foster. Paich was a part of the session group on the Michael Jackson album Thriller. He played piano, synthesizer, and did some synth and rhythm arrangements.

In 1982, Paich produced and arranged the song "It's A Long Road" for the film First Blood.

In 1989, Paich produced and arranged the Oscar-nominated song "The Girl Who Used to Be Me", written by Marvin Hamlisch and Alan and Marilyn Bergman, for the film Shirley Valentine and produced the song "I'll Be Holding On", written by Hans Zimmer and Will Jennings, for the film Black Rain.

In 1994, Paich was a producer on the Tramaine Hawkins album To a Higher Place which was nominated for Best Contemporary Soul Gospel Album in the 37th Annual Grammy Awards.

In October 2009, Paich was inducted into the Musicians Hall of Fame along with the other members of Toto.

Paich was the Co-Music Director for President Bill Clinton's Foundation Concert in 2011. That year Paich also performed on the all-star benefit album entitled Jazz For Japan (Avatar Records).

He was the music coordinator for 2012 Music Cares Person of the Year, Paul McCartney.

For his contributions to the world of music, Paich was honored with the 2013 South-South Award for Lifetime Cultural Achievement.

As a session musician, Paich has played on numerous soundtracks and on albums by many artists, including Elkie Brooks' album Rich Man's Woman; Bryan Adams' song "Please Forgive Me"; the Michael Jackson songs "Earth Song", "The Girl Is Mine", "Heal the World", "Stranger in Moscow", and "I Just Can't Stop Loving You"; and the USA for Africa song "We Are the World", as well as work with Aretha Franklin, Boz Scaggs, Quincy Jones, Melanie Safka, Don Henley, Diana Ross, the Doobie Brothers, Neil Diamond, Seals and Crofts, Steely Dan, Elton John, Joe Cocker, Rod Stewart, Cher, Sarah Vaughan, Randy Newman, Tina Turner, the Brothers Johnson and Pink.

Paich traveled to China, where he worked composing the theme music for the 2008 Summer Olympics. In 2009, he sang the hit song "Africa" at the Millennium Development Goals awards in New York and co-produced a new tune for George Benson. Paich was involved with the 61st Primetime Emmy Awards as a music producer and keyboardist for the on-stage band.

=== Solo career ===
In 2022, Paich announced his debut solo album titled Forgotten Toys. It was released by The Players Club (Mascot Label Group) on August 19, 2022. On June 9, 2022, he released the first single titled "Spirit of the Moonrise," followed by July 14's "Queen Charade."

Paich has said he plans to release more solo music in the future and he has "some stuff lying around here", and is often "slow" because he is "methodical and a perfectionist, sometimes too much...".

== Personal life ==
David Paich was born in Los Angeles, California to Hilda Lorraine "Huddy" Paich (née Hurst) and Martin Louis "Marty" Paich. His mother died on April 30, 1979, and his father died on August 12, 1995.

He had one sister, Lorraine Louise "Lorrie" Cohen (née Paich), who died on December 20, 2010, at age 58. She was a survivor of a double lung transplant that took place in November 2006, and Paich took a leave of absence from Toto in 2003–2008 to help care for her. She has three credits on albums her brother David was involved in. These include two production credits, one from the 1978 Cheryl Lynn self-titled debut album David produced, and one from the 1981 Sarah Vaughan album titled Songs of the Beatles. She was also credited as providing vocals on the Toto song "Struck By Lightning" from their 2018 studio album Old Is New.

He married his wife, Lorraine Ann Paich (née Doherty), on December 8, 1984. They have one daughter together named Elizabeth Rianna Paich, who was born on November 4, 1988.

== Awards ==
- 1974 – Emmy Award for Best Song or Theme: David Paich & Marty Paich (songwriters) – "Light The Way", from the Ironside episode "Once More For Joey"
- 1977 – Grammy Award for Best R&B Song: David Paich & Boz Scaggs (songwriters) – "Lowdown", from the Boz Scaggs album Silk Degrees
- 1982 – Grammy Award for Best Vocal Arrangement for Two or More Voices: David Paich (arranger) – "Rosanna", from the Toto album Toto IV
- 1982 – Grammy Award for Best Instrumental Arrangement Accompanying Vocalist(s): Jerry Hey, David Paich, and Jeff Porcaro (arrangers) – "Rosanna", from the Toto album Toto IV
- 1982 – Grammy Award for Record of the Year: Toto – "Rosanna", from the Toto album Toto IV
- 1982 – Grammy Award for Producer of the Year: Toto – Toto IV
- 1982 – Grammy Award for Album of the Year: Toto – Toto IV

== Sources ==
- Bolden, Juliana J. (September 18, 2009). "Pop-rock giants Steve Jordan, David Paich strike up one hot band". Emmys.com.
- "Equipment Dave". Toto99.com. Archived from the original on February 19, 2012.
- Eskow, Gary (July 14, 2006). "How David Paich Recorded Toto's Latest Album". MixOnline.com. Archived from the original on April 6, 2009.
- O'Neil, Thomas (1993). The Grammys For the Record.
