= Stranger in Town (Toto song) =

Single by Toto

from the album Isolation
- B-side: "Change of Heart"
- Released: October 15, 1984
- Genre: New wave; synth-rock
- Length: 4:47 (album version); 3:54 (7″ version)
- Label: Columbia
- Songwriters: David Paich; Jeff Porcaro
- Producer: Toto

Toto singles chronology
"Waiting for Your Love" (1983)	"Stranger in Town" (1984)	"Angel Don't Cry" (1985)

"Stranger in Town" is a song by American rock band Toto from their fifth studio album Isolation (1984). The song was written by David Paich and Jeff Porcaro, and features Paich on lead vocals. Though Bobby Kimball is officially credited as a guest musician on the album, having been fired from Toto, "Stranger in Town" was recorded while he was still a member of the group.

It was the first single released from the Isolation album, reaching the top 30 on the Billboard Hot 100 in December 1984. The song was the band's highest charting hit on the Mainstream Rock chart, peaking at number seven. It was also a top 40 single in Australia, where it remains the fourth highest charting single by Toto.

== Live performances ==
The song was performed live during the 1985 Isolation tour as well as during the first leg of the subsequent Fahrenheit tour in October–November 1986 before being dropped for the second (European) leg of the tour. It then only resurfaced in the band's live set in 2015–16 (on the Toto XIV tour) and again in 2018 (40 Trips around the Sun tour).

== Music video ==
The music video (filmed in black and white and directed by Steve Barron) and lyrics to the song are based on the film Whistle Down the Wind, about an escaped convict who runs into a group of children who mistake him for Jesus. Actor Brad Dourif plays the convict, and new member Fergie Frederiksen appears as a murder victim. Dourif and Toto would also work on the movie Dune that same year. The band only appears briefly in the video. In 1985, the video was nominated at the MTV Music Video Awards for Best Direction.

== Personnel ==
=== Toto ===
- David Paich – lead and backing vocals, synthesizers
- Fergie Frederiksen – lead and backing vocals
- Steve Lukather – guitars, backing vocals
- Steve Porcaro – synthesizers
- Mike Porcaro – bass guitar
- Jeff Porcaro – drums, percussion

=== Additional musicians ===
- Bobby Kimball – backing vocals
- Richard Page – backing vocals
- Gene Morford – bass vocals
- Mike Cotten – synthesizers
- Tom Scott – saxophone

== Charts ==
Chart (1984–1985)	Peak position
Australia (Kent Music Report)	40
Canada Top Singles (RPM)	16
UK Singles Chart	100
US Billboard Hot 100	30
US Top Rock Tracks (Billboard)	7
