= LogRhythm =

American security intelligence company

LogRhythm Inc.
- Type: Privately held company
- Industry: Technology (software)
- Founded: 2003
- Defunct: 2024 Merged with Exabeam
- Headquarters: Boulder, Colorado, US
- Key people: Christopher O'Malley, President & CEO; Phillip Villella, Chief Scientist and Co-Founder; Chris Petersen, Co-Founder
- Products: Security Information and Event Management (SIEM), Cyber Threat Defense
- Website: logrhythm.com

LogRhythm, Inc. was a global security intelligence company that specialized in Security Information and Event Management (SIEM), log management, network monitoring, user behavior and security analytics. Headquartered in Boulder, Colorado, LogRhythm operates in North and South America, Europe, India, the Middle East, Turkey, Africa, and the Asia Pacific region.

The company was founded in 2003 by Chris Petersen and Phillip Villella, based in Washington D.C, and initially known as Security Conscious, Inc. In 2005, it rebranded as LogRhythm and relocated to Boulder, Colorado. LogRhythm provides self-hosted and cloud-native SIEM Platforms to provide assistance with monitoring, detecting, investigating and responding to cybersecurity threats.

In May 2018, the private equity firm Thoma Bravo announced that it was going to acquire a majority interest in LogRhythm. The transaction was completed in Jul-2018; financial details were not released.

In 2019, LogRhythm released a Software as a Service (SaaS) version of their SIEM Platform, LogRhythm Cloud.

In 2022, LogRhythm launched LogRhythm Axon, a new, cloud-native SIEM platform.

In May 2024, LogRhythm announced the planned merger with SIEM vendor Exabeam; while the financial terms were not announced, Exabeam's most recent valuation was $2.5 billion. The merger was finalized in July 2024, with Christopher O'Malley, former CEO of LogRhythm, named as the CEO of the newly combined company operating under the Exabeam name.

== See also ==
- Loggly
- Sumo Logic
- Splunk
- Prelude SIEM (Intrusion Detection System)
