= Dennis Frederiksen =

American rock singer (1951–2014)

- Also known as: Fergie Frederiksen, David London
- Born: Dennis Hardy Frederiksen; May 15, 1951; Grand Rapids, Michigan, U.S.
- Died: January 18, 2014 (aged 62) Mound, Minnesota, U.S.
- Genres: Hard rock; pop rock; progressive rock; pop
- Occupations: Musician; singer-songwriter
- Instruments: Vocals, keyboards, guitar
- Years active: 1975–87; 1995–2014
- Label: Frontiers
- Formerly of: Toto, LeRoux, Survivor, Angel, Trillion

Dennis Hardy "Fergie" Frederiksen (May 15, 1951 – January 18, 2014) was an American rock singer best known as the former lead singer of Trillion, Angel, LeRoux and Toto, as well as providing backing vocals for Survivor. He contributed to hit singles in three consecutive years, all with different bands: Survivor's "American Heartbeat" in 1982, LeRoux's "Carrie's Gone" in 1983 and Toto's "Stranger in Town" in 1984.

== Early life and career ==
Frederiksen started his musical career at the age of 13, and he played clubs and pubs at the age of 15 with a group called the Common People in Grand Rapids, Michigan. In 1975, while he was still attending college at Central Michigan, Frederiksen was asked by his friend Tommy Shaw to replace him as the lead vocalist for the band MSFunk, as Shaw was leaving to join Styx. Frederiksen was with MSFunk for a year before disbanding in 1976. While living in Chicago, he helped form a local progressive rock band called Trillion with keyboardist Patrick Leonard. Trillion's debut album was released in 1978 and was produced by Gary Lyons (producer of Foreigner's debut album); all but one of its nine tracks were co-written by Frederiksen. The band went on to tour with Styx, Heart and Aerosmith, where Frederiksen began performing his trademark back-flips during live shows to fire up crowds, a tactic he would continue with later bands. Frederiksen would leave the group after one album, and was replaced by Thom Griffin.

After leaving Trillion, Frederiksen started focusing mainly on session work; primarily movie soundtracks. In 1979, he signed with Casablanca Records, where he performed under the alias of David London. (Frederiksen wanted to separate his rock image from the disco image Casablanca was known for.) He sang two tracks ("Samantha" and "Sound Of The City") on the soundtrack to Can't Stop the Music (which reached number 47 on the Billboard 200), as well as a more AOR-style solo album in 1981, with his friend Mark Christian as the lead guitarist. This would turn out to be one of the last albums released by Casablanca Records, as the fall of disco in the early 1980s forced the label to fold, eventually becoming part of Polygram Records. He would drop the stage name soon after, officially going by his childhood nickname "Fergie", which stemmed from his grade school classmates once incorrectly thinking his last name was "Ferguson".

While at Casablanca, he met Gregg Giuffria, of the recently defunct glam-rock band Angel (one of the few rock acts signed by the record label). The two started working in his studio in late 1981 in hopes of a possible new Angel LP under a new line-up. It was in these Angel recordings where Frederiksen met bassist Ricky Phillips. The two became long-time friends and have collaborated on many projects. This line-up never completed an official album, as Giuffria started focusing heavily on the formation of his group Giuffria in 1982, but did record three songs during band sessions: "Whips", "Troubleshooter", and "Should Have Known Better". These tracks were later released on the Angel Rarities collection, and were eventually covered by White Sister.

After Kansas singer Steve Walsh originally left the band, auditions were held in early 1982. Frederiksen was one of several candidates who tried out, but John Elefante eventually took over the lead vocal spot. However, Kansas manager Budd Carr spotted Fergie during auditions and began working with him soon after, which ultimately would prove instrumental for Frederiksen's career. It was around this time that long-time friends Jim Peterik and Frankie Sullivan from Survivor invited Frederiksen to their studio during the recording of their third album, while lead singer Dave Bickler was experiencing vocal cord strain. Ultimately, Bickler was able to finish the album, and Frederiksen assisted with background vocals. The band's third album Eye of the Tiger was released in May 1982, with Frederiksen credited simply as "Fergie". It jumped to number 2 on the Billboard charts, and eventually went 2× Platinum on the strength of its #1 title track. Frederiksen provided harmonies on five tracks, including the album's second single, "American Heartbeat", which charted in the top 20.

In late summer of 1982, Frederiksen and Asia (not the hit-making British supergroup) guitarist Jim Odom were both recruited by manager Budd Carr, to replace lead singer/guitarist Jeff Pollard of LeRoux, who had recently left the band to start his own Christian ministry. Fergie became LeRoux's new front-man soon after. So Fired Up, the band's fifth album, was released in February 1983. It included the hit song "Carrie's Gone", which Frederiksen wrote shortly after breaking up with then girlfriend Carrie Hamilton (Carol Burnett's daughter). The band was dropped from RCA Records, broke up, but reformed in 1985 with a new singer and are still together and touring. They were recently inducted into the Louisiana Music Hall of Fame. Meanwhile, Frederiksen reunited with Ricky Phillips to start a brand new band called Abandon Shame, featuring Journey keyboardist Jonathan Cain, and his wife Tane. The quartet worked on 5 songs in 1984, with Fergie only singing on one of the tracks. The Kevin Elson–produced "You Can't Do That", "Burnin' in the Third Degree", and "Photoplay" appeared in the soundtrack to The Terminator, and were credited to Tahnee Cain and Trianglz. While "Kicks" and "Over Night Sensation" would eventually appear in the 1985 film Armed Response, with Tane and Fergie singing the leads respectively.

Phillips, who was friends with Toto drummer Jeff Porcaro, gave him a Frederiksen demo. Toto, who had fired lead singer Bobby Kimball in the midst of recording their fifth album Isolation, invited Frederiksen to come audition for his spot. After edging out Eric Martin, he got the job, and the band finished recording Isolation, which was released in October 1984. It included the hit song "Stranger in Town" and went Gold. The music video for "Stranger in Town", which featured Fergie as the murder victim, was nominated at the 1985 MTV Video Music Awards for Best Direction. After touring with Toto through 1985, Frederiksen was fired from the band during the initial recording sessions for Fahrenheit, mainly due to his difficulties with performing in the studio. He repeatedly cited his brief tenure with Toto as the highlight of his career.

== Later life, career, and death ==
Frederiksen performing in a concert.

Following his expulsion from Toto, Frederiksen took to touring as "Toto", using a setlist which included many Toto songs that predated his time with the band. This angered the band, who had already taken out an injunction against Frederiksen's predecessor, Bobby Kimball, to stop him from doing the same thing. (Toto and Frederiksen were reconciled in 2007, at which point he joined them on stage for a few guest spots on their tour.) After 12 years in the music industry, Frederiksen unofficially retired and started focusing on the restaurant business with his father.

He returned to music in the mid-1990s to reunite and collaborate with Ricky Phillips. Their Frederiksen/Phillips album was released in 1995, and featured Giuffria's David Glen Eisley on background vocals. Phillips also assisted Frederiksen with his solo album Equilibrium in 1999, which also featured artists like Neal Schon, Steve Porcaro, Jason Scheff, Ron Wikso, Rocket Ritchotte, Dave Amato, Bruce Gowdy and many others. He later explained, "I tried to do without [music] but I was miserable." The album was critically acclaimed in Europe and Japan. In 2002, he joined the band Mecca, where he reunited with Jim Peterik. Fergie also did several collaborations with Tommy Denander after his return to music, and also toured with the World Classic Rockers and the Voices of Classic Rock.

In June 2010, Frederiksen announced he had been diagnosed with inoperable cancer. He had been suffering from Hepatitis C and presented a few fundraisers to raise awareness of the disease. Medical treatments for the cancer made it difficult for him to do recording sessions, and initially he planned on retiring again. However, his friend Alex Ligertwood pushed him to continue. After starting treatment, Frederiksen released two more solo albums: Happiness is the Road and Any Given Moment.

He died from liver cancer on January 18, 2014, at his home in Mound, Minnesota. He was survived by his three sons.

== Discography ==
=== Main albums ===
- 1978: Trillion: Trillion (as Dennis Frederiksen)
- 1981: David London: David London (as David London)
- 1983: LeRoux: So Fired Up
- 1984: Toto: Isolation
- 1995: Frederiksen/Phillips: Frederiksen/Phillips
- 1999: Fergie Frederiksen: Equilibrium
- 2002: Mecca: Mecca
- 2007: Frederiksen/Denander: Baptism By Fire
- 2011: Fergie Frederiksen: Happiness is the Road
- 2013: Fergie Frederiksen: Any Given Moment
- NOTE: The above discography ONLY includes official studio releases in which Fergie Frederiksen sang lead vocals on at least half of the tracks.

=== Featured artist ===
- 1976: MSFunk: Platform Shoes (a.k.a...Vinylly) (archival) (special thanks)
- 1980: Village People: Can't Stop the Music ("Samantha" and "Sound of the City" as David London)
- 1981: Village People: Renaissance (producer, writer, V.P. band)
- 1981: Angel: Rarities (archival) (sings on 3 tracks)
- 1981: Ulysses 31: Original Television Soundtrack (U.S. Main Theme) (archival)
- 1982: Cher: I Paralyse (writing)
- 1982: Survivor: Eye of the Tiger (background vocals)
- 1983: LeRoux: AOR Live (archival) (sings on "Don't Stand in My Way")
- 1984: Wiz Kidz: Familiar Stranger (musical assistance)
- 1984: Toto: Dune (backing vocals on "Take My Hand" (alternate version))
- 1986: Toto: Fahrenheit (backing vocals on "Could This Be Love")
- 1986: White Sister: Fashion By Passion (writer)
- 1987: Karo: Heavy Birthday (backing vocals on "Ball of Fire")
- 1997: Joseph Williams: 3 (sings on "Goin' Home")
- 2000: World Classic Rockers: World Classic Rockers Vol. 1 (sings on 6 tracks)
- 2001: Radioactive: Ceremony of Innocence (sings on "On My Own" and "Ceremony of Innocence")
- 2003: World Classic Rockers: World Classic Rockers Vol. 2 (sings on 6 tracks)
- 2003: Radioactive: Yeah (sings on "Demon" and "7 A.M.")
- 2004: AOR: Nothing But the Best (sings on "Desperate Dreams")
- 2005: Radioactive: Taken (sings on "Forgiveness")
- 2005: Northern Light: Northern Light (sings on "Eye to Eye")
- 2008: Myland: No Man's Land (sings on "When the Love is Gone")
- 2009: AOR: Journey to L.A (sings on "Desperate Dreams" (new version))
- 2013: AOR: The Secrets Of L.A (sings on "Deep Whirlpool")
- 2013: Radioactive: Legacy (sings on "Premonition")
- 2013: UT New Trolls: Duo Ut Des (featured on "Can't Go On")
- 2015: Radioactive: F4ur (sings on "Back To The Game" and "Just A Man")
- NOTE: The discography above ONLY includes previously unreleased material contributed to by Fergie Frederiksen.

=== Project Timeline ===
- Flyin Home: (1972–1974)
- Common People: (1974–1975)
- MS Funk: (1975–1976)
- Trillion: (1977–1979)
- David London: (1979–1981)
- Angel: (1981–1982)
- LeRoux: (1982–1983)
- Abandon Shame: (1984)
- Toto: (1984–1985)
- RTZ: (1987)
- The Fergie Frederiksen Group: (1995–1997)
- Voices of Classic Rock: (2002)
- Mecca: (1999–2005)
- World Classic Rockers: (1997–2014)
