= Lost Lake (Minnesota) =

Lake in the state of Minnesota, United States

- Location within Minnesota Location within the United States
- Location: Minnesota
- Coordinates: 45.0305693°N 93.4155970°W
- Basin countries: United States
- Surface area: 45 acres (18 ha)
- Surface elevation: 929 ft (283 m)
- Settlements: Mound, Minnesota

Lost Lake is located entirely within the city limits of Mound, Minnesota. It is part of Lake Minnetonka, connected by a channel to Cooks Bay, and considered by the city of Mound to be important to its re-development plans with the hope being that boat users will increase its downtown business traffic. In the past, lake steamers used Lost Lake's channel or canal to bring tourists into the downtown area, when Lake Minnetonka was a resort area. The channel has been re-dredged, docks have been built, and the clean-up of nearby contaminated soil has been done. The lake's name is assumed to be based on its being nearly completely overgrown by cattails and reeds. But that is said to serve the valuable purpose of filtering the surface runoff into Lake Minnetonka.
