= Mound, Minnesota =

City in Minnesota, United States

- City
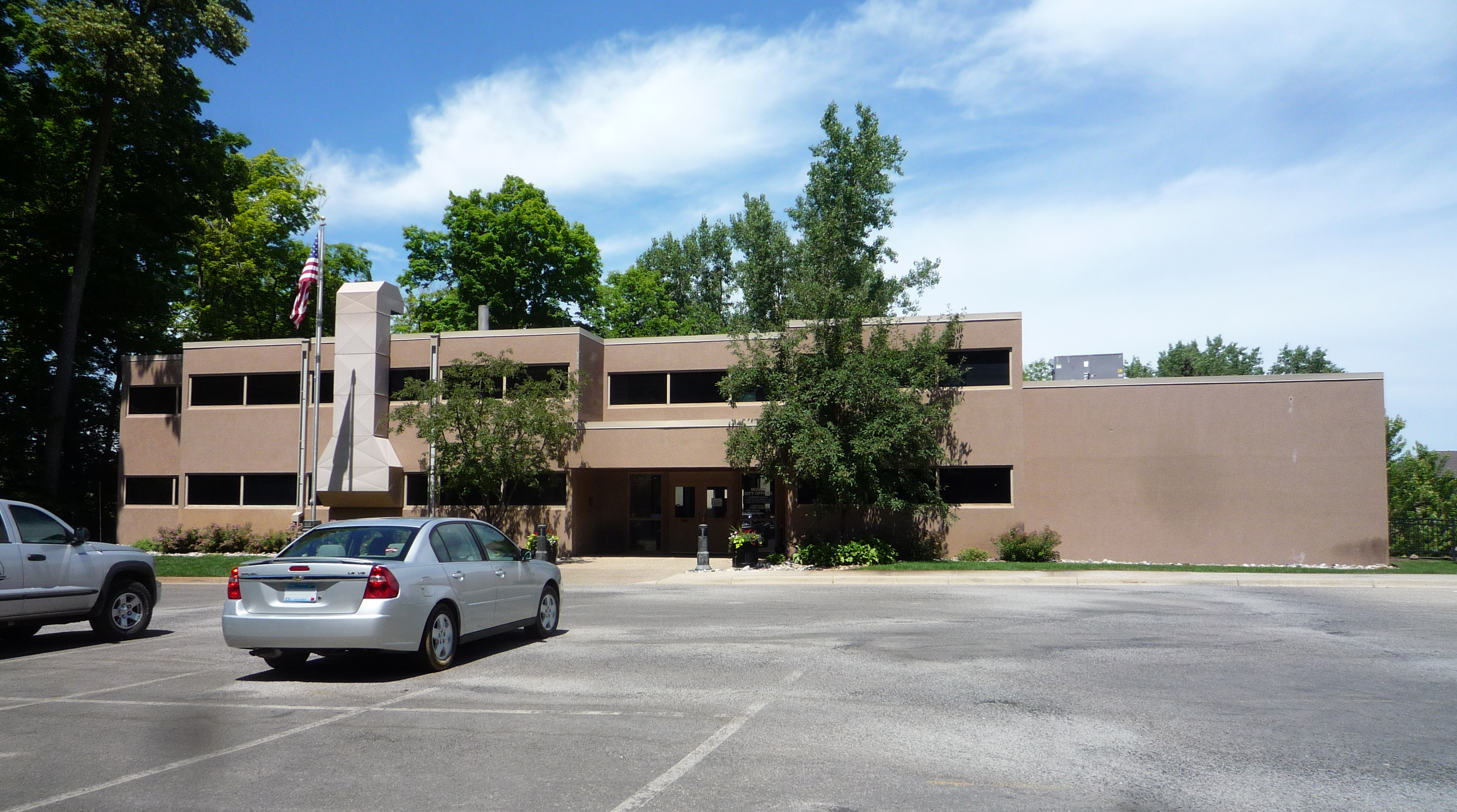
- City Hall in 2009.

- Logo

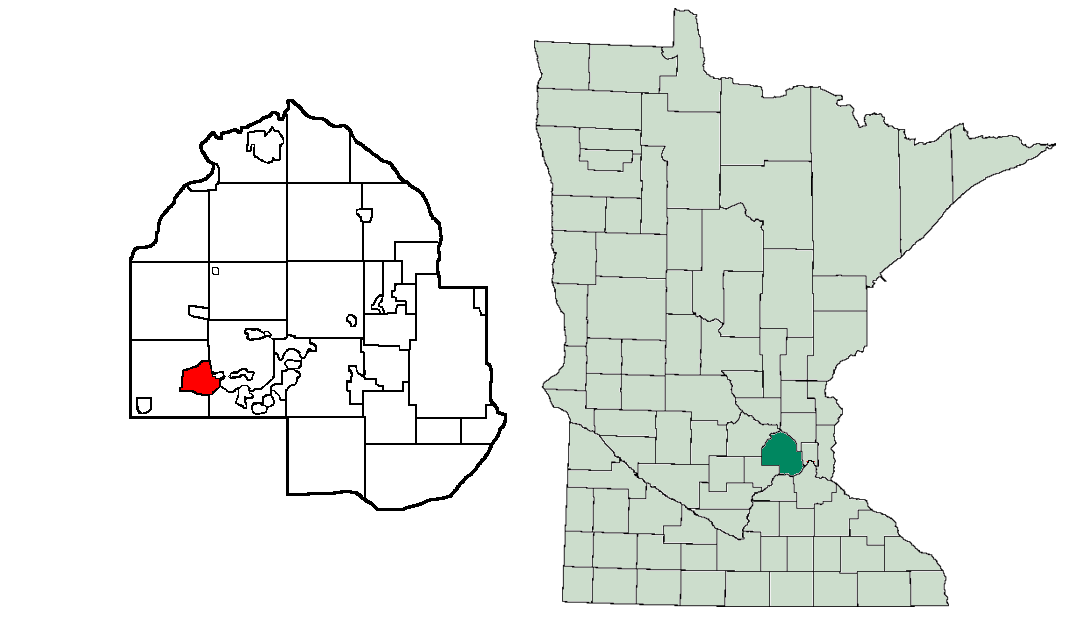
- Location of Mound within Hennepin County, Minnesota
- Coordinates: 44°56′12″N 93°39′58″W
- Country: United States
- State: Minnesota
- County: Hennepin

Government
  - Mayor: Jason R. Holt

Area
  - Total: 5.08 sq mi (13.15 km^{2})
  - Land: 2.86 sq mi (7.41 km^{2})
  - Water: 2.22 sq mi (5.74 km^{2})

Population (2020)
  - Total: 9,398
  - Density: 3,284.9/sq mi (1,268.31/km^{2})
- Time zone: UTC-6 (Central (CST))
  - Summer (DST): UTC-5 (CDT)
- ZIP code: 55364
- Area code: 952
- FIPS code: 27-44476
- Website: www.cityofmound.com

Mound is a city in western Hennepin County, Minnesota, United States. The population was 9,398 at the 2020 census. Mound was the birthplace of the Tonka truck that is named after Lake Minnetonka, which the eastern part of town sits on. Mound is 22 miles (35 km) west of Minneapolis, the county seat.

== History ==
According to Melvin Gimmestad's Historical Backgrounds of Mound, Minnesota, "Mound derived its name from the Indian mounds once found within the present day city limits. They were not built by the Dakota Indians, but were made by prehistoric Indians".

The former municipality of Island Park, which contained Phelps Island, merged with Mound in 1960.

Mound celebrated its centennial in 2012.

== Geography ==
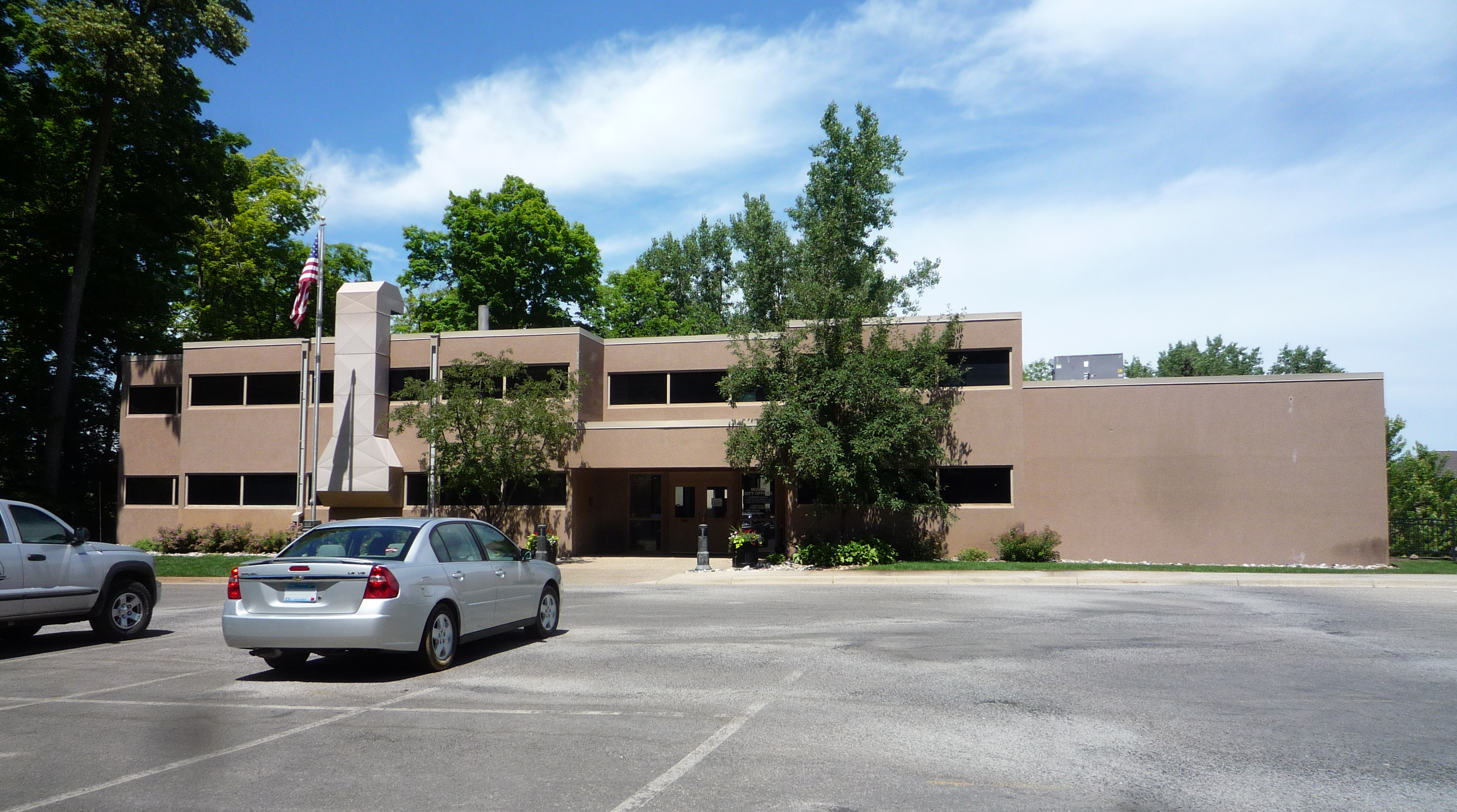
City Hall

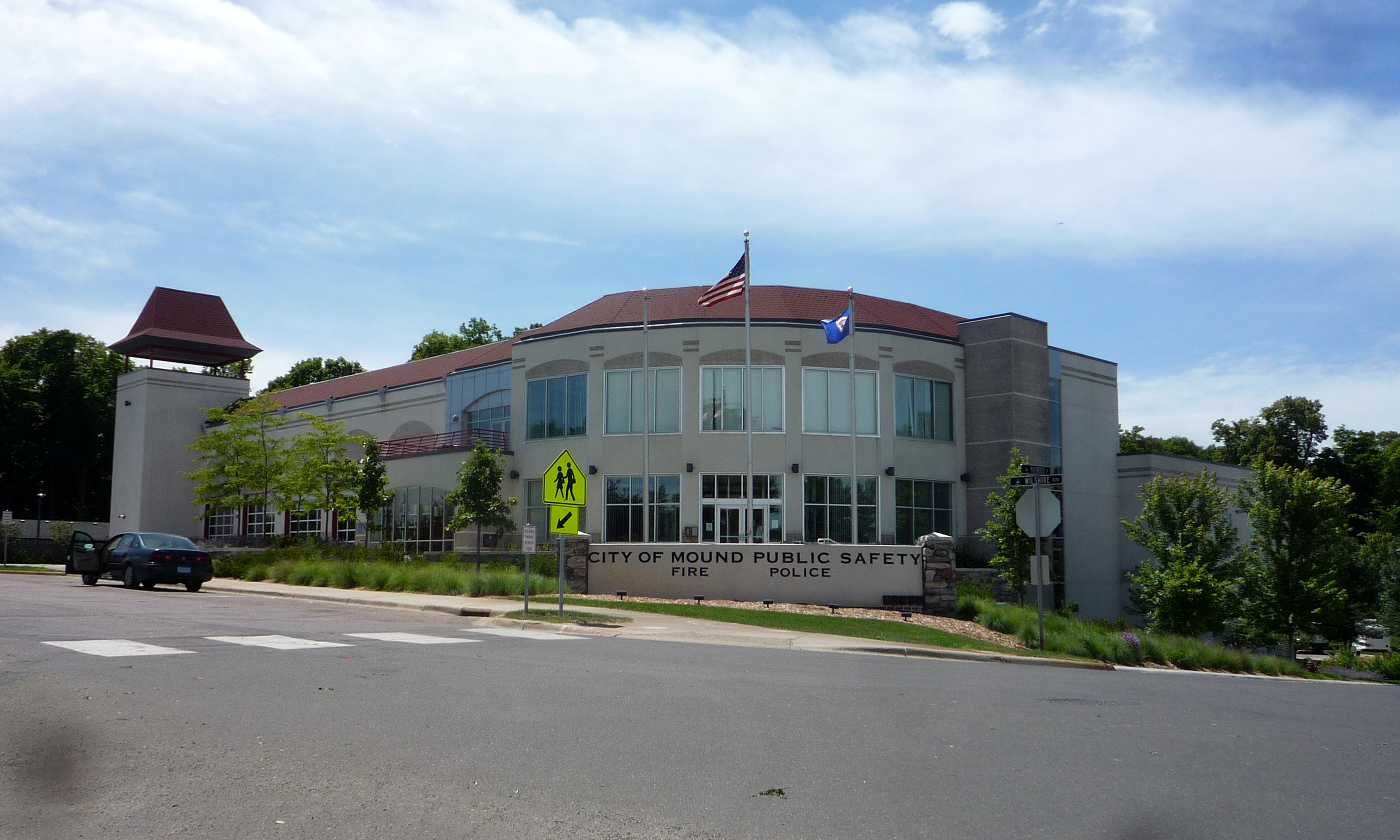
The Mound Public Safety Facility houses both the city's Fire and Police Departments.

According to the United States Census Bureau, the city has an area of 4.96 square miles (12.85 km^{2}), of which 2.86 square miles (7.41 km^{2}) is land and 2.10 square miles (5.44 km^{2}) is water. County Roads 15 and 110 are two of the main routes.

Lakes in Mound include Black Lake, Dutch Lake, Lake Langdon, Saunders Lake, and Seton Lake. Lake Minnetonka encompasses these and many others in the area. Mound has more than 1,000 docks on its various lakes. The lakes geographically define the town's areas, such as Three Points, The Island, The Highlands, Grandview Boulevard and Shirley Hills.

Lake Langdon is immediately west of Mound, between an old Great Northern railroad line and Lake Minnetonka. One of its most notable places is an old ice house and grocery store at the east side of the lake. For many years in the 1940s and '50s, the store was owned and operated by Ed and Pete Sollie, uncles of the Andrews Sisters singing group. Other historic places on Lake Langdon's east shore are Our Lady of the Lake parochial school and the Mound Baptist Church, long cared for by Ulrich Eugster, an immigrant to the U.S. from Reute, Switzerland.

== Demographics ==
Historical population
Census	Pop.	Note	%±
1930	206		—
1940	526		155.3%
1950	1,357		158.0%
2020	9,398		—
U.S. Decennial Census for Island Park

Historical population
Census	Pop.	Note	%±
1920	393		—
1930	668		70.0%
1940	1,189		78.0%
1950	2,061		73.3%
1960	5,440		163.9%
1970	7,572		39.2%
1980	9,280		22.6%
1990	9,634		3.8%
2000	9,435		−2.1%
2010	9,052		−4.1%
2020	9,398		3.8%

=== 2020 census ===
As of the 2020 census, Mound had a population of 9,398. The median age was 42.6 years. 20.2% of residents were under the age of 18 and 16.8% of residents were 65 years of age or older. For every 100 females there were 106.5 males, and for every 100 females age 18 and over there were 104.6 males age 18 and over.

100.0% of residents lived in urban areas, while 0.0% lived in rural areas.

There were 4,160 households in Mound, of which 26.5% had children under the age of 18 living in them. Of all households, 48.4% were married-couple households, 22.4% were households with a male householder and no spouse or partner present, and 21.6% were households with a female householder and no spouse or partner present. About 30.7% of all households were made up of individuals and 11.4% had someone living alone who was 65 years of age or older.

There were 4,497 housing units, of which 7.5% were vacant. The homeowner vacancy rate was 1.0% and the rental vacancy rate was 5.8%.

Racial composition as of the 2020 census
Race	Number	Percent
White	8,340	88.7%
Black or African American	122	1.3%
American Indian and Alaska Native	58	0.6%
Asian	171	1.8%
Native Hawaiian and Other Pacific Islander	0	0.0%
Some other race	126	1.3%
Two or more races	581	6.2%
Hispanic or Latino (of any race)	349	3.7%

=== 2010 census ===
As of the census of 2010, there were 9,052 people, 3,974 households, and 2,444 families living in the city. The population density was 3,165.0 inhabitants per square mile (1,222.0/km^{2}). There were 4,379 housing units at an average density of 1,531.1 per square mile (591.2/km^{2}). The racial makeup of the city was 95.8% White, 0.9% African American, 0.3% Native American, 1.3% Asian, 0.4% from other races, and 1.4% from two or more races. Hispanic or Latino of any race were 1.8% of the population.

There were 3,974 households, of which 27.8% had children under the age of 18 living with them, 48.1% were married couples living together, 8.6% had a female householder with no husband present, 4.9% had a male householder with no wife present, and 38.5% were non-families. 30.7% of all households were made up of individuals, and 7.9% had someone living alone who was 65 years of age or older. The average household size was 2.28 and the average family size was 2.85.

The median age in the city was 42.6 years. 21.3% of residents were under the age of 18; 6.4% were between the ages of 18 and 24; 25.9% were from 25 to 44; 35% were from 45 to 64; and 11.5% were 65 years of age or older. The gender makeup of the city was 51.5% male and 48.5% female.

=== 2000 census ===
As of the 2000 census, there were 9,435 people, 3,982 households, and 2,560 families living in the city. The population density was 3,203.8 inhabitants per square mile (1,237.0/km^{2}). There were 4,118 housing units at an average density of 1,398.3 per square mile (539.9/km^{2}). The diverse racial makeup of the city was 96.24% White, 0.64% African American, 0.19% Native American, 1.30% Asian, 0.04% Pacific Islander, 0.45% from other races, and 1.14% from two or more races. Hispanic or Latino of any race were 0.96% of the population. 32.4% were of German, 14.1% Norwegian, 11.8% Irish, 7.7% Swedish and 6.1% English ancestry.

There were 3,982 households, out of which 30.2% had children under the age of 18 living with them, 53.5% were married couples living together, 7.4% had a female householder with no husband present, and 35.7% were non-families. 28.3% of all households were made up of individuals, and 7.0% had someone living alone who was 65 years of age or older. The average household size was 2.37 and the average family size was 2.93.

In the city, the population was spread out, with 23.9% under the age of 18, 6.2% from 18 to 24, 35.6% from 25 to 44, 25.4% from 45 to 64, and 9.0% who were 65 years of age or older. The median age was 38 years. For every 100 females, there were 108.3 males. For every 100 females age 18 and over, there were 106.9 males.

The median income for a household in the city was $60,671, and the median income for a family was $68,396. Males had a median income of $44,437 versus $34,125 for females. The per capita income for the city was $30,309. About 0.9% of families and 2.7% of the population were below the poverty line, including 1.7% of those under age 18 and 5.1% of those age 65 or over.

== Economy ==
The Mound City Council has been working for several years on a project named "Mound Visions". One of the project's goals is to improve business traffic in the city. Some of its recent accomplishments are the Mound Marketplace, the realignment of County Road 15, the Lost Lake Greenway, and the Villas on Lost Lake townhouses.

== Education ==
Because the Westonka School District encompasses Mound, the city is also connected to Spring Park, Orono, St. Bonifacius, and Minnetrista. Mound schools include Grandview Middle School, Hilltop Primary School, Westonka High School, and Shirley Hills Elementary. The school mascot is the Whitehawk, which was changed from the Mohawk in 1997. Some students attend public schools in other school districts chosen by their families under Minnesota's open enrollment statute.

== Infrastructure ==
The city water system notified customers in 2021 that the water supply had elevated levels of manganese. Mound was served by the Great Northern Railway Hutchinson Line as a commuter stop. It was abandoned in the 1980s during the Burlington Northern era.

== Notable people ==
- Sheldon Beise – All-American fullback on Bernie Bierman's undefeated national championship football teams at the University of Minnesota, 1934–1935
- The Andrews Sisters singing group – Patty, Maxene and LaVerne spent summers in Mound as children from 1918 through 1931, and returned to visit at least one week each July. They visited their uncles Pete and Ed Sollie at their small grocery store, often visited the Mound Casino, and relaxed at the Mound swimming beach, reminiscing about their childhood.
- Kevin Sorbo – Actor, born and raised in Mound.
- Kris Humphries – Professional basketball player and ex-husband of Kim Kardashian, has a home in Mound on the shores of Lake Minnetonka, which was featured on the wedding special of Keeping up with the Kardashians.
- Henning Linden – U.S. Army Brigadier General during World War II, born in Mound.
- Dennis Frederiksen - former member of the band Toto.
- Christopher O'Malley – President and CEO of LogRhythm & Compuware and Board Director of various companies, born and raised in Mound.
- Taylor Matson – Professional ice hockey player
