= Minnehaha Creek Watershed District =

Hennipen County Minnesota drainage basin

Coordinates: 44°56′18″N 93°28′25″W

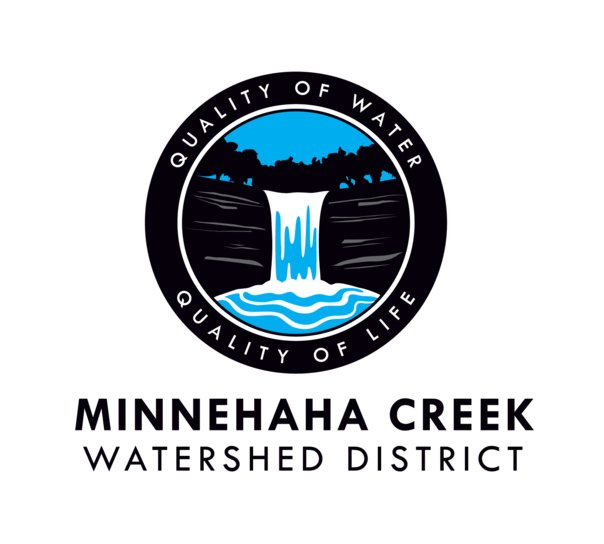

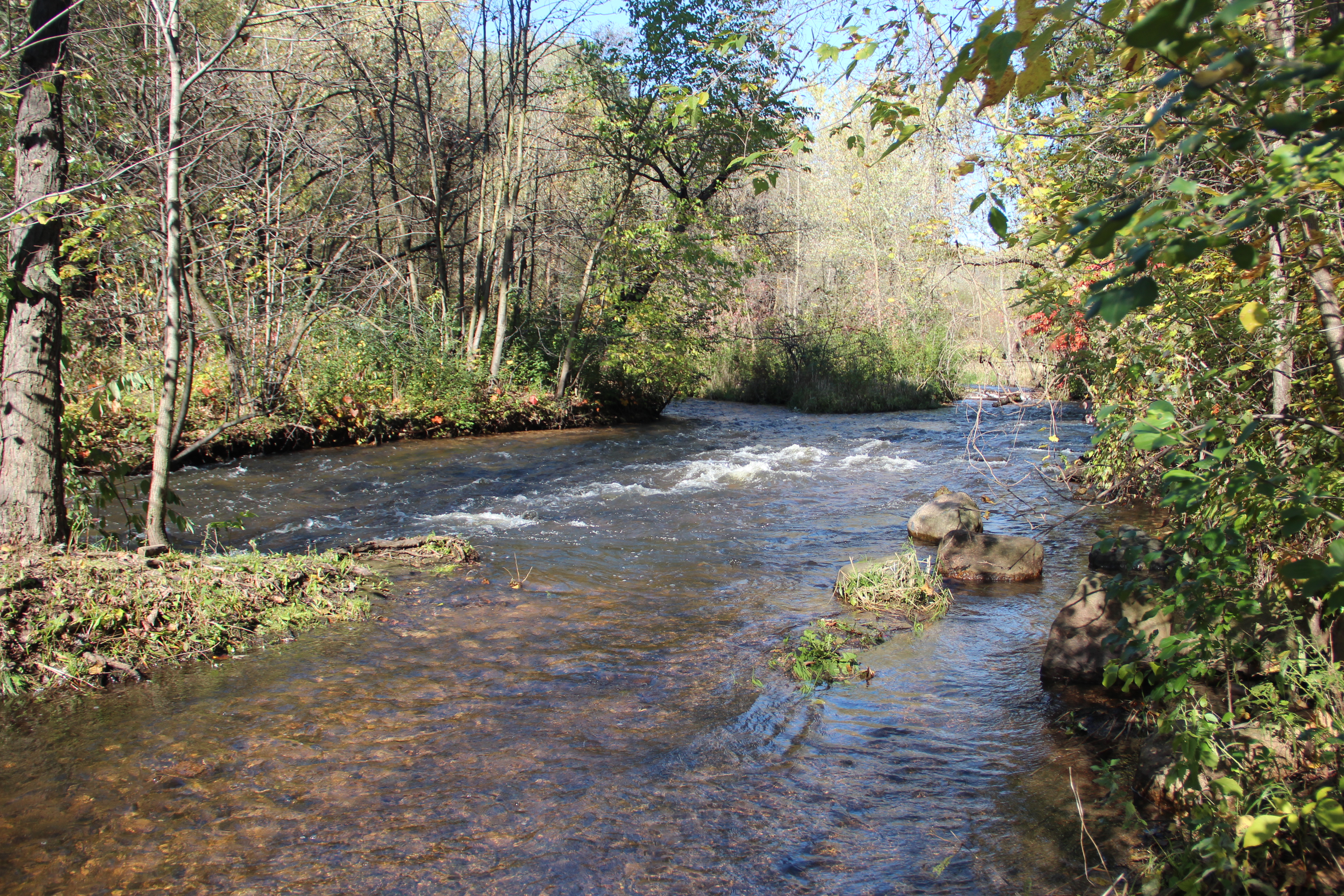

Watershed District overview
- Formed: 1967
- Headquarters: 15320 Minnetonka Blvd, Minnetonka, MN 55345
- Watershed District executive: James Wisker
- Website: minnehahacreek.org

The Minnehaha Creek Watershed District is a watershed district in Minnesota with a mission to collaborate with public and private partners to protect and improve land and water for current and future generations. The Minnehaha Creek in its name refers to the water link from Lake Minnetonka to the Mississippi River. The watershed is much larger than a lake or creek, including 29 communities and encompassing 178 square miles (460 km^{2}). It stretches west from roughly Minnehaha Falls to Saint Bonifacius and north to Maple Plain. It includes 129 lakes and 8 major creeks in Hennepin and Carver counties. Some of the lakes in the district are Bde Maka Ska, Harriet, Nokomis, Parley, Minnewashta and Katrina.

The District's office is located in Minnetonka, Minnesota. Its leadership is made up of seven Board Members and a Citizen Advisory Committee. The current District Administrator is James Wisker.

== History ==
Through collaborative planning, aligned investments, streamlined permitting, technical expertise and educating/engaging residents, the MCWD seeks to create a landscape of vibrant communities within the watershed. Established in 1967, the MCWD was created under the Minnesota Watershed District Act of 1955. The act charged watershed districts with integrating water management efforts among city, county and state agencies. Districts receive funding through local property taxes.

A 2012-13 outreach event and vulnerability assessment conducted by the MCWD concerning flooding response and stormwater management garnered recognition as a case study by the EPA's Adaptation Resource Center (ARC-X).

The watershed drew public attention in April 2014 from a 4-3 board decision to fire long-serving administrator Eric Evenson-Marden. Concerns were raised after the firing about transparency and personal infighting, which spurred city mayors within the district to request the taping of committee meetings. Lars Erdahl was selected as a successor in another 4-3 vote in January 2015.
