= Someday/Somehow =

Studio album by Steve Porcaro
- Released: June 10, 2016
- Recorded: 1983–2016
- Studio: Porcara Musica (Los Angeles); The Village Recorder (Los Angeles); Record One (Los Angeles); Capitol Studios (Hollywood); Additional recording: TudorTones Studio (Valley Village); The Metal Building (Nashville); The Blue Corner (Los Angeles); Tossimo's (North Hollywood); Vineyard West (Los Angeles)
- Genre: Pop; Singer-songwriter
- Length: 56:30
- Label: Porcara Musica
- Producer: Steve Porcaro; Michael Sherwood

Steve Porcaro chronology
Someday/Somehow (2016)	The Very Day (2025)

Someday/Somehow is the debut solo album from Steve Porcaro.

== History ==
Steve Porcaro worked on the album for many years with collaborator Michael Sherwood. Several members of Porcaro's band Toto guest on the album, including his two brothers Mike and Jeff Porcaro, who had died before the album was released, and Steve Lukather, Lenny Castro, Shannon Forrest and Mabvuto Carpenter.

Two songs planned for the album were used instead on Toto's Toto XIV: "The Little Things" and, as a Japan-only bonus track, "Bend". "Back to You" was worked on by Toto in 1983 and finished in 2015.

== Track listing ==
All tracks are written by Steve Porcaro, with additional writers noted.

No.	Title	Writer(s)	Length
1.	"Ready or Not"	Michael Sherwood, Jamie Kimmett	5:18
2.	"Loved by a Fool"	Sherwood	4:20
3.	"Someday/Somehow"	Sherwood	4:33
4.	"Swing Street"	Sherwood	4:48
5.	"She's So Shy"	Sherwood, Kimmett	3:49
6.	"Back to You"		4:02
7.	"Face of a Girl"	Sherwood, Kimmett	4:30
8.	"To No One"	Sherwood	4:28
9.	"Make Up"	Sherwood	4:20
10.	"She's the One"	Sherwood	3:21
11.	"Night of Our Own"	Sherwood, Kimmett	3:35
12.	"Painting by Numbers"	Sherwood, Julius Robinson	4:32
13.	"More Than I Can Take"		4:04
Total length:			56:30

== Personnel ==
=== Musicians ===
- Steve Porcaro – keyboards (all tracks), lead vocals (1–3, 6, 8, 10, 13), backing vocals (3–5, 7–9, 11, 12), acoustic piano (13)
- John Van Tongeren – synthesizers (11)
- Marc Bonilla – guitars (1, 5, 7)
- Jimmy Haun – guitars (3, 4, 8, 9), acoustic guitar (11)
- Steve Lukather – guitars (4, 10–12)
- Mike Porcaro – bass guitar (1, 4–7, 9)
- Sam Porcaro – bass guitar (3)
- Shannon Forrest – drums (1, 5, 10)
- Robin Dimaggio – drums (2, 7, 12), percussion (3, 9, 12)
- Toss Panos – drums (4)
- Jeff Porcaro – drums (6)
- Rick Marotta – drums (11)
- Lenny Castro – percussion (1–5, 7, 10–12)
- Mike Biardi – loops (5, 7)
- Don Markese – clarinet (3), tin whistle (6), flute (9, 10)
- Chuck Manning – saxophones
- Scott Whitfield – trombone
- Carl Saunders – trumpet, trumpet solo (4)
- Timothy Loo – cello
- Darrin McCann – viola
- Marisa Kuney – violin
- Songa Lee – violin
- Michael Sherwood – backing vocals (1–10, 12), lead vocals (9)
- Michael McDonald – lead vocals (4, 11)
- Jamie Kimmett – lead vocals (5, 7), backing vocals (5, 7, 11, 12)
- Mabvuto Carpenter – lead vocals (12)

=== Production ===
- Steve Porcaro – producer
- Michael Sherwood – co-producer
- Forrest Riege – engineer
- Ryan Johnson – engineer
- Mike Ging – engineer
- David Davis – string engineer
- Marc Bonilla – guitar engineer (1, 5, 7)
- Shannon Forrest – drum engineer (1, 5, 10)
- Ed Cherney – drum engineer (2)
- Oscar "Ozzio" Doniz – drum engineer (4)
- Greg Ladanyi – bass and drum engineer (6)
- Julian Chan – drum engineer (7)
- John Paterno – mixing, mastering
- Heather Porcaro – photography, art design
- Alec Dixon – art design
- Matt Garton – art design
