= The Shaming of the True =

Studio album by Kevin Gilbert
- Released: February 13, 2000
- Recorded: Lawnmower and Garden Supply, Pasadena; NRG Recording Studios, North Hollywood; Coast Recorders, San Francisco (posthumous)
- Genre: Progressive rock
- Length: 67:27
- Label: KMG
- Producer: Kevin Gilbert

Kevin Gilbert chronology
Live at the Troubadour (1995)	The Shaming of the True (2000)	Nuts (2009)

Professional ratings
Review scores
Source	Rating
Allmusic	link

The Shaming of the True is a rock opera by Kevin Gilbert. It is Gilbert's second solo album, released posthumously in February 13, 2000. The album was first released in 2000 as a limited edition and later as a conventional jewel-case CD. Remasters were published in 2008, 2011 (as a limited edition box set), and 2022, marking the final remaster to appear in print. The album name is a play on words referencing the Shakespeare comedy The Taming of the Shrew.

== Story ==
The album follows the rise and fall of a singer/musician named Johnny Virgil, whose career follows an arc common to many stars of rock and roll. The narrative introduces a gifted young Johnny dreaming of success, before his fall into the trap of exploitation at the hands of record companies, seduced by fame and substance abuse. As his career becomes larger than life, the many compromises he made provoke a sense of disconnection with his former self. He becomes increasingly burned out and withdrawn, eventually experiencing a breakdown of his psyche. He steps away from his career and enters a period of isolation and depression, which concludes with peaceful self-acceptance. Much later in life, Johnny finds himself on the streets and notices one of his songs on the oldies radio late at night.

== Production ==
=== Recording ===
Recording of the album started in 1995. Mixer John Cuniberti described the recording process as "extremely creative, open-ended, chaotic, or the only way an incredibly intense musical prodigy was capable of working. Bits and pieces of song ideas appeared — a bass track here, a synth track there, scratch vocals with piano, etc. There were no track sheets or notes on the technical information and song titles, just a lot of interesting music." Gilbert had recorded "Johnny's Last Song" on the street outside of his studio in Pasadena, California, as well as the rain and train whistle. The recording sessions had largely been completed before Gilbert's unexpected death, which "intensified the process of making the album in a way [Cuniberti] could never have predicted".

=== Mixing ===
Gilbert's manager and friend, Jon Rubin, asked Nick D'Virgilio and Cuniberti to finish, archive, and catalog all of Gilbert's recordings for his estate, which proved very difficult as Gilbert did not make notes or track sheets, meaning they needed to piece together the takes of many instruments. They identified material for at least five albums, much of which will be released on a forthcoming box set.

Cuniberti was first asked to mix "Imagemaker" to determine if he could improve Gilbert's rough mixes they had on a Digital Audio Tape. The Shaming of the True was the first album they started mixing, on which the work began in early 1997. The mixing and additional recordings were done at Coast Recorders in San Francisco, California because of the vintage Neve console, of which Gilbert reportedly loved the sound. The final mix was based on Gilbert's rough mixes and a handwritten note that was believed to be the last running order of the opera, from which the production staff never ventured too far. The rough mixes sometimes contained tracks that were not found on the master tracks.

Some recordings were made or added posthumously. As the vocals for "Certifiable #1 Smash" had not been recorded yet, the song was initially not considered for inclusion on the record, but Gilbert's vocals were later taken from the live version from the Live at the Troubadour recording, in which the audience can occasionally be heard. The spoken word section was initially performed by Bobby Slayton, but was ultimately also replaced by the live recording of Gilbert. Guitar solos were contributed for "Water Under the Bridge" by Tommy Dunbar and for "The Way Back Home" by David Levita. A few missing vocals were filled in by D'Virgilio.

Before his death, Gilbert left out two songs originally intended for the rock opera. "Miss Broadway" was released on Live at the Troubadour, and "The Best of Everything" was released on Bolts in 2009. Both songs allude to his breakup with Sheryl Crow, which might have distracted from the main story of Johnny Virgil.

=== Mastering and releases ===
The album was mastered four times. The mixes were on 1/2" analog tape that were out of sequence, and needed to be assembled and crossfaded digitally. Additional elements not on the mix tapes needed to be included, while imperfections such as "clicks" caused by console switches and "pops" from plosives that overload the microphone, needed to be removed.

The first edition was mastered by Cuniberti and Ken Lee at Rocket Lab in San Francisco. It was encoded with HDCD and had a fat, dynamic sound. "The mastering required a few failed attempts and a remix before I got something I felt was good enough and honored Kevin’s vision," Cuniberti explains. This album was initially released in early 2000 as a limited edition (of 1,400) hardbound book with CD, artwork and complete libretto by John Seabury. This CD package was nominated for a Grammy for Best Album Artwork. Later in 2000, a conventional jewel CD case version was released.

In 2008, Cuniberti was asked to produce new masters for the album, because the original parts for the first mastering were destroyed or lost when the mastering studio and pressing plant went out of business. He used his equipment at The Plant Recording Studios. Because the trend was to make albums sound louder by adding more compression, the audio was less dynamic, though the low-mid presentation was improved. It was released as a jewel CD box. Shortly after the 2008 remastering, the studio closed its doors and the backup tapes were useless without a computer running a SADiE 4 DAW. In addition, the pressing plant lost the master used for replication.

Cuniberti did another remaster in his home studio in 2011, for which he took a more strictly "purist" approach by loading the original 1/2” analog mix tapes directly into Pro Tools in 24-bit at 96 kHz, and only applying a bit of equalization and limiting, without analog or digital compression. This resulted in a cleaner, punchier and more open sounding album. He also intentionally left in some performance flaws such as "pops" and "clicks", and replaced the mix of "Parade" as he had used an incorrect one for the previous masters. This second remaster was released as a special limited edition 2-CD box set in 2011, containing fourteen 12″ × 12″ prints, and with the second disc containing an alternate version of "Parade" recorded by Gilbert, an orchestrated version of "A Long Day's Life" by Mark Hornsby, and a spoken word version of the entire album performed by Jamie DeWolf.

The last remastering was done in 2022, which was first released on vinyl on 24 february 2022, and in 2023 as digipack, which marks the final standard release. It has a similar clarity and warmth to the 2011 remaster, but is more polished, with the flaws again removed. In late 2023, a box set including this remaster and bonus discs with demos, outtakes and alternate versions will be released. This will be the ultimate release on print media before the rights management is arranged to make the album available for streaming.

== Track listing ==
=== Original release ===
All tracks are written by Kevin Gilbert, with additional writers noted.

No.	Title	Writer(s)	Length
1.	"Parade"		3:44
2.	"The City of the Sun"		5:55
3.	"Suit Fugue (Dance of the A&R Men)"		2:24
4.	"Imagemaker"		3:38
5.	"Water Under the Bridge"	Robert Ferris	5:29
6.	"The Best Laid Plans"		5:38
7.	"Certifiable #1 Smash"	Nick D'Virgilio; Russ Parrish	7:20
8.	"Staring into Nothing"		5:51
9.	"Fun"	Bill Bottrell; Brian MacLeod; David Baerwald	5:33
10.	"From Here to There"		2:11
11.	"Ghetto of Beautiful Things"	Bottrell; MacLeod	4:53
12.	"A Long Day's Life"		7:28
13.	"The Way Back Home"		4:55
14.	"Johnny's Last Song"		2:15
Total length:			50:32

=== 2011 reissue ===
Disc 2
No.	Title	Length
1.	"Parade (Alternate Version)"	1:41
2.	"A Long Day's Life (Alternate Version)"	8:08
Total length:		60:21

== Personnel ==
=== Musicians ===
- Kevin Gilbert – vocals, guitar, bass, piano, keyboards, programming, sequencing, percussion, drum programming
- Nick D'Virgilio – drums, percussion, bass, guitar, keyboards, backing vocals
- Brian MacLeod – drums
- Tommy Dunbar – additional guitar
- Russ Parrish – additional guitar
- David Levita – additional guitar
- Bill Bottrell – additional guitar
- Robert Ferris – backing vocals
- Jennifer Gross – backing vocals
- Skyler Jett – backing vocals
- Claytoven – backing vocals
- Sandy Sawyer – backing vocals
- Jon Rubin – backing vocals
- Tommy Dunbar – backing vocals
- The Le Petomane Ensemble – horns

==== 2011 reissue (Disc 2) ====
- Allen Walley – bass (2)
- Mary Scully – bass (2)
- Paddy Lannigan – bass (2)
- Anthony Pike – bass clarinet (2)
- Dave Stewart – bass trombone (2)
- Anthony Pleeth – cello (2)
- Dave Daniels – cello (2)
- Jo Knight – cello (2)
- Paul Kegg – cello (2)
- Dave Fuest – clarinet (2)
- Nicholas Bucknall – clarinet (2)
- Karen Jones – flute (2)
- Martin Owen – French Horn (2)
- Mike Thompson – French Horn (2)
- Richard Watkins – French Horn (2)
- Skaila Kanga – harp (2)
- Helen Keen – piccolo flute (2)
- Lindsay Shilling – tenor trombone (2)
- Roger Harvey – tenor trombone (2)
- Andy Crowley – trumpet (2)
- Kate Moore – trumpet (2)
- Mark Bennett – trumpet (2)
- Owen Slade – tuba (2)
- Bruce White – viola (2)
- Kate Musker – viola (2)
- Pete Lale – viola (2)
- Rachel Bolt – viola (2)
- Caroline Dale – viola (2), cello (2)
- Aidan Broadbridge – violin (2)
- Boguslaw Kostecki – violin (2)
- Cathy Thompson – violin (2)
- Chris Tombling – violin (2)
- Dai Emmanuel – violin (2)
- David Woodcock – violin (2)
- Emlyn Singleton – violin (2)
- Everton Nelson – violin (2)
- Jonathan Rees – violin (2)
- Julian Leaper – violin (2)
- Maciej Rakowski – violin (2)
- Mark Berrow – violin (2)
- Patrick Kiernan – violin (2)
- Peter Hanson – violin (2)
- Rita Manning – violin (2)
- Steve Morris – violin (2)
- Tom Pigott-Smith – violin (2)
- Frank Ricotti – percussion (2)
- Bill Lockhart – timpani (2)
- Rick Wentworth – conductor (2)
- John Hinchey – arrangement (2)
- Phil Knights – music preparation (2)
- Jamie DeWolf – spoken word (3–14)

=== Technical ===
- Produced, recorded, and engineered by Kevin Gilbert
- Associate producers – Nick D'Virgilio and John Cuniberti
- Mixed by John Cuniberti
- Executive producer – Jon Rubin
- Additional recording – John Cuniberti and Blair Lamb
- Assistant engineer – Mike Johnson
- Mastered by Ken Lee and John Cuniberti
- Illustrations – John Seabury (also numbered and signed all 1,400 copies of the original limited-edition hardbound book release)
- Photography and design – Hugh Brown

==== 2011 reissue (Disc 2) ====
- Produced, recorded, and mixed by Mark Hornsby (2)
- Additional engineers – Brandy Barnett, John Hill, and Jon Craig (2)
- Assistant engineers – Nichols Morrow, Paul Pritchard, and Pete Hutchings (2)
- Mastered by Bob Katz (2)
