= Hoodslam =

Professional wrestling promotion based in Oakland, California

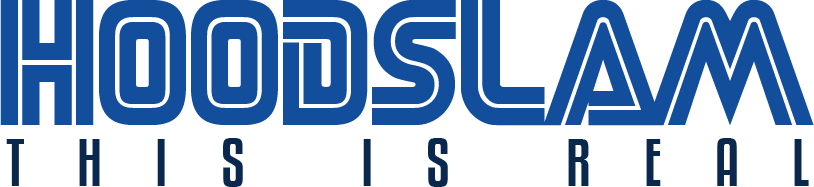
- HOODSLAM logo used in the early 2010s
- Founded: 2010
- Headquarters: Oakland, California
- Founder: Sam Khandaghabadi (Dark Sheik)
- Sister: Guilty Lethal Action Mayhem (GLAM); Sexy Goodtime Wrestle Show; Beachslam
- Website: www.birdswillfall.com

Hoodslam (stylised as HOODSLAM), and currently branded as SlamTown, is a professional wrestling promotion based in Oakland, California. Created in 2010 by Sam Khandaghabadi (known professionally as Dark Sheik) as a regular gathering for wrestlers who wanted to perform edgier acts for adults, Hoodslam quickly became a popular attraction in the Bay Area, attracting over 1,000 attendees at each monthly show. Hoodslam performances combine the athleticism and tropes of professional wrestling with more bizarre, absurd characters, as well as profanity, sexuality, and public consumption of alcohol and other drugs, which are not considered appropriate at mainstream professional wrestling events. As a result, entry to Hoodslam shows is restricted to those aged 21 years or older.

== History ==
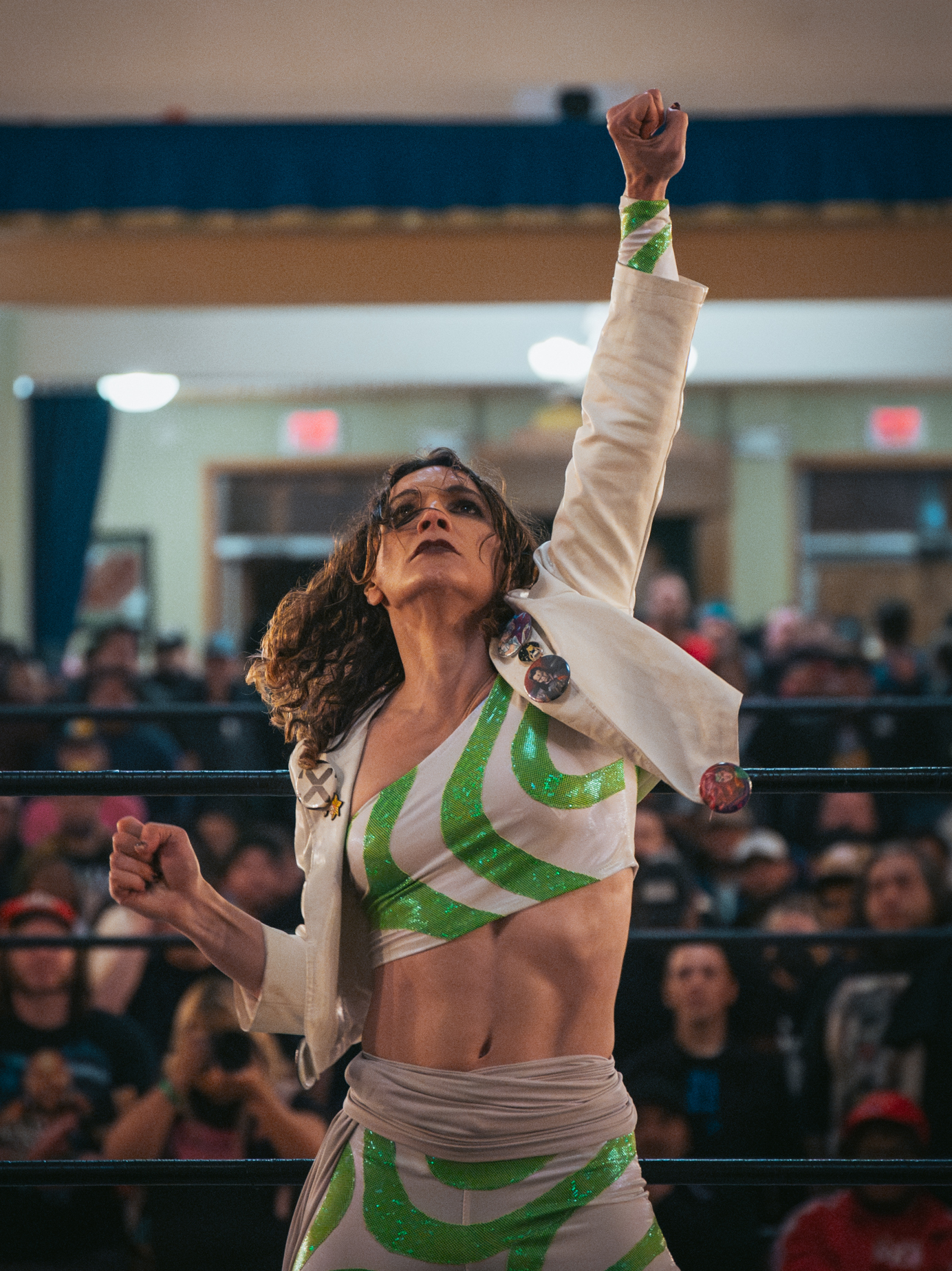
Hoodslam founder Dark Sheik, pictured here in 2024

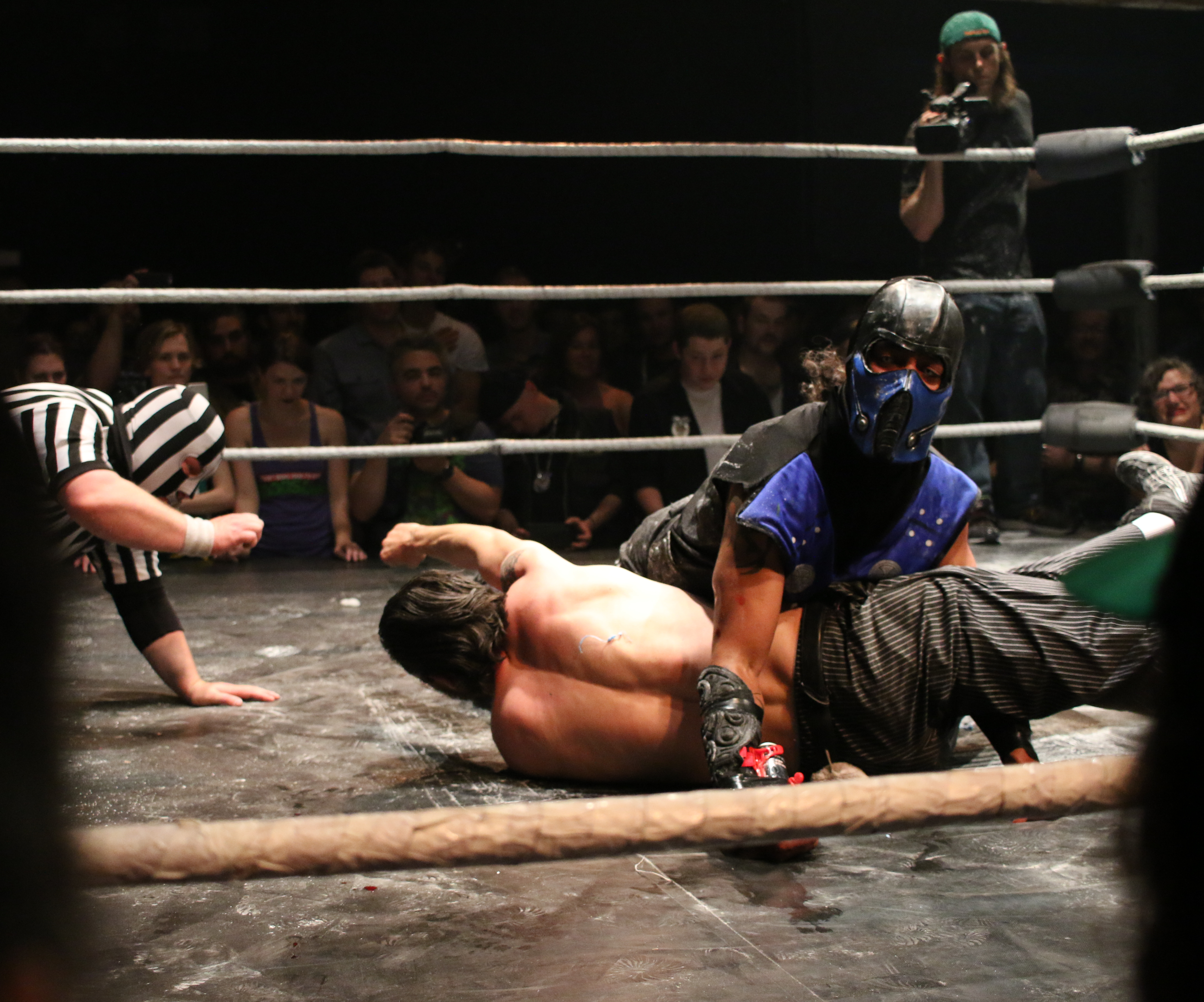
Drugz Bunny (a parody of Bugs Bunny) kicks out of a pin attempt by "Sub-Zero". Parody characters are a staple of Hoodslam shows.

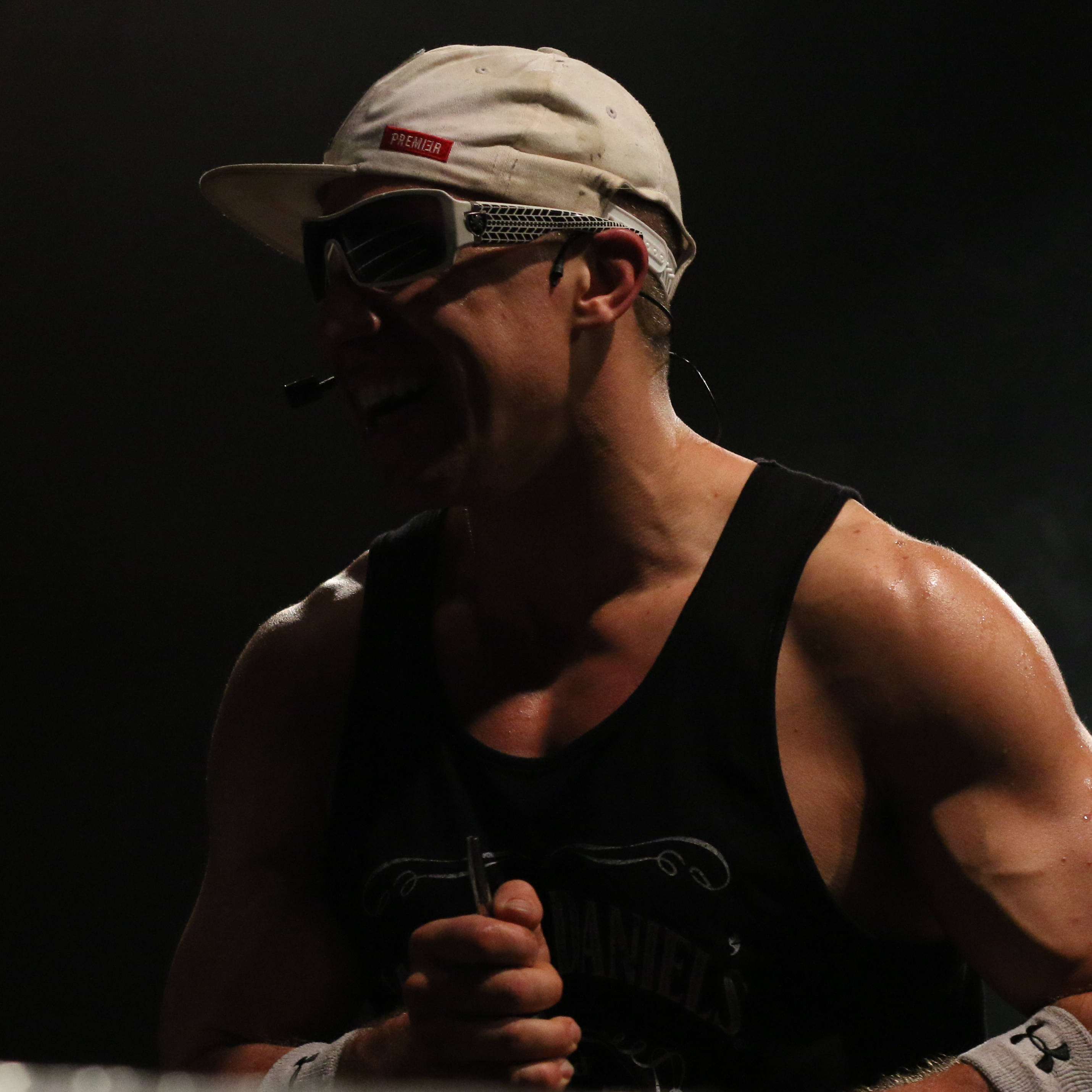
"Broseph" Joe Brody serves as Hoodslam's MC; at the beginning of each show he distributes shots of Jack Daniel's to ringside fans.

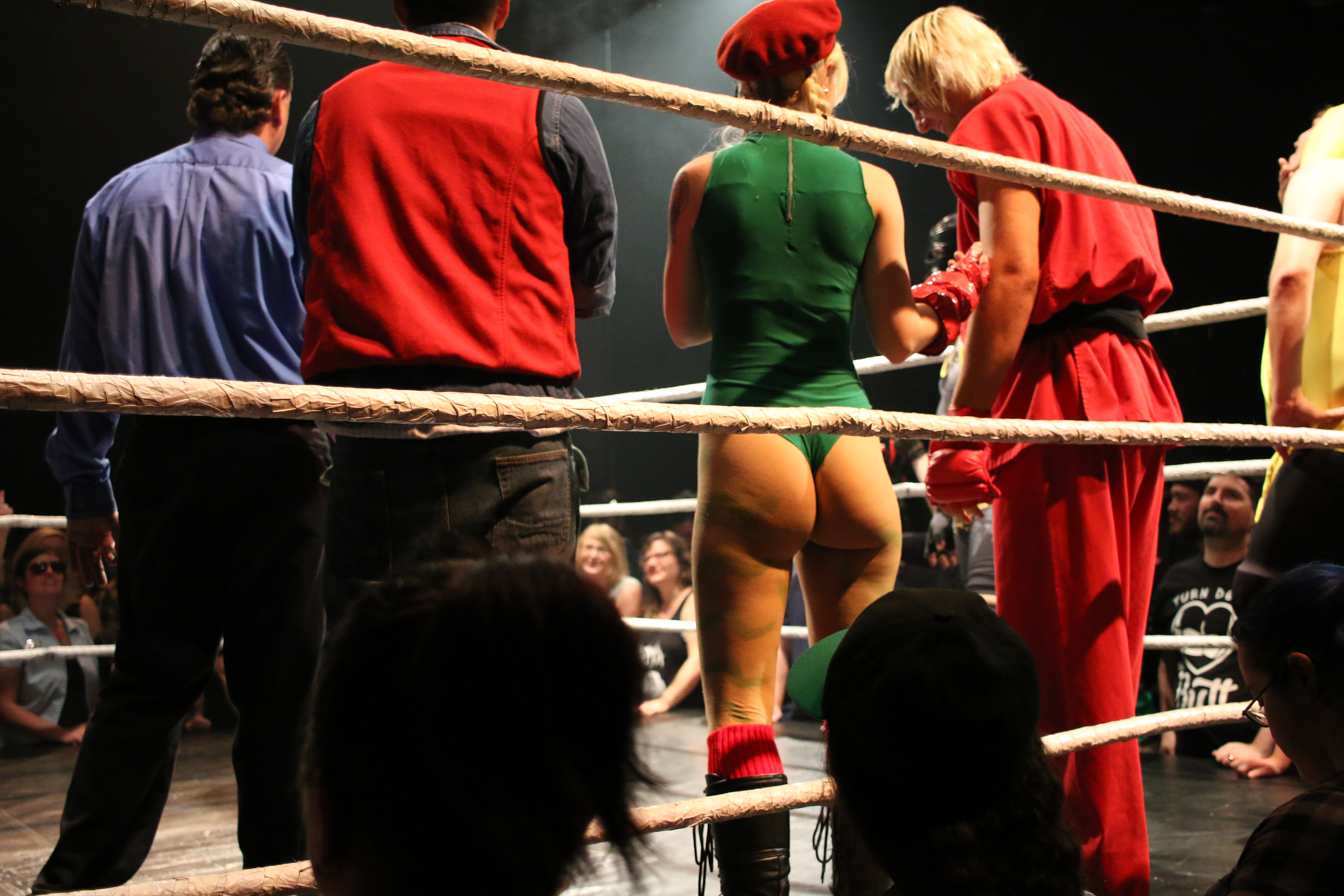
Street Fighter's Cammy and Ken converse before a match.

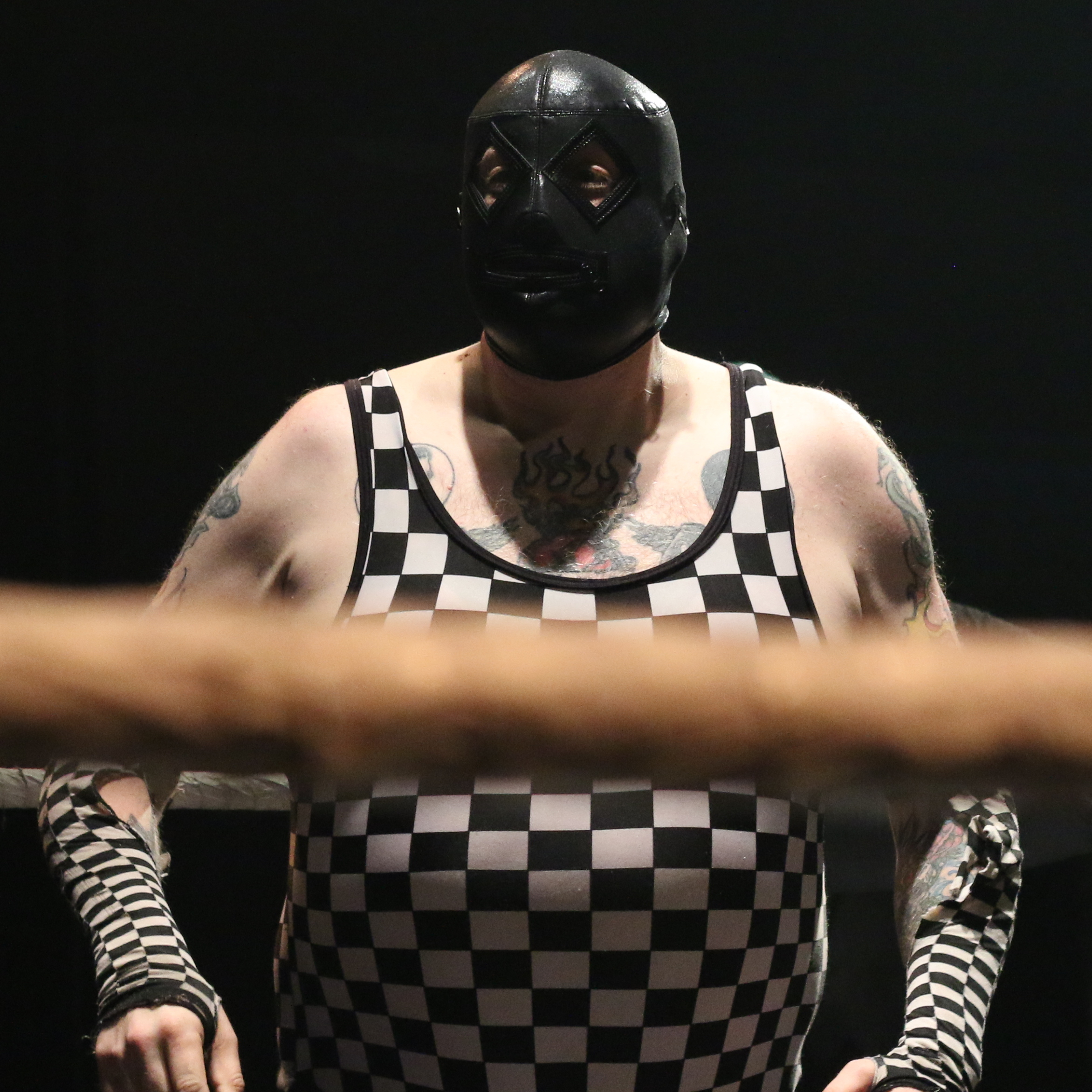
Otis the Gimp

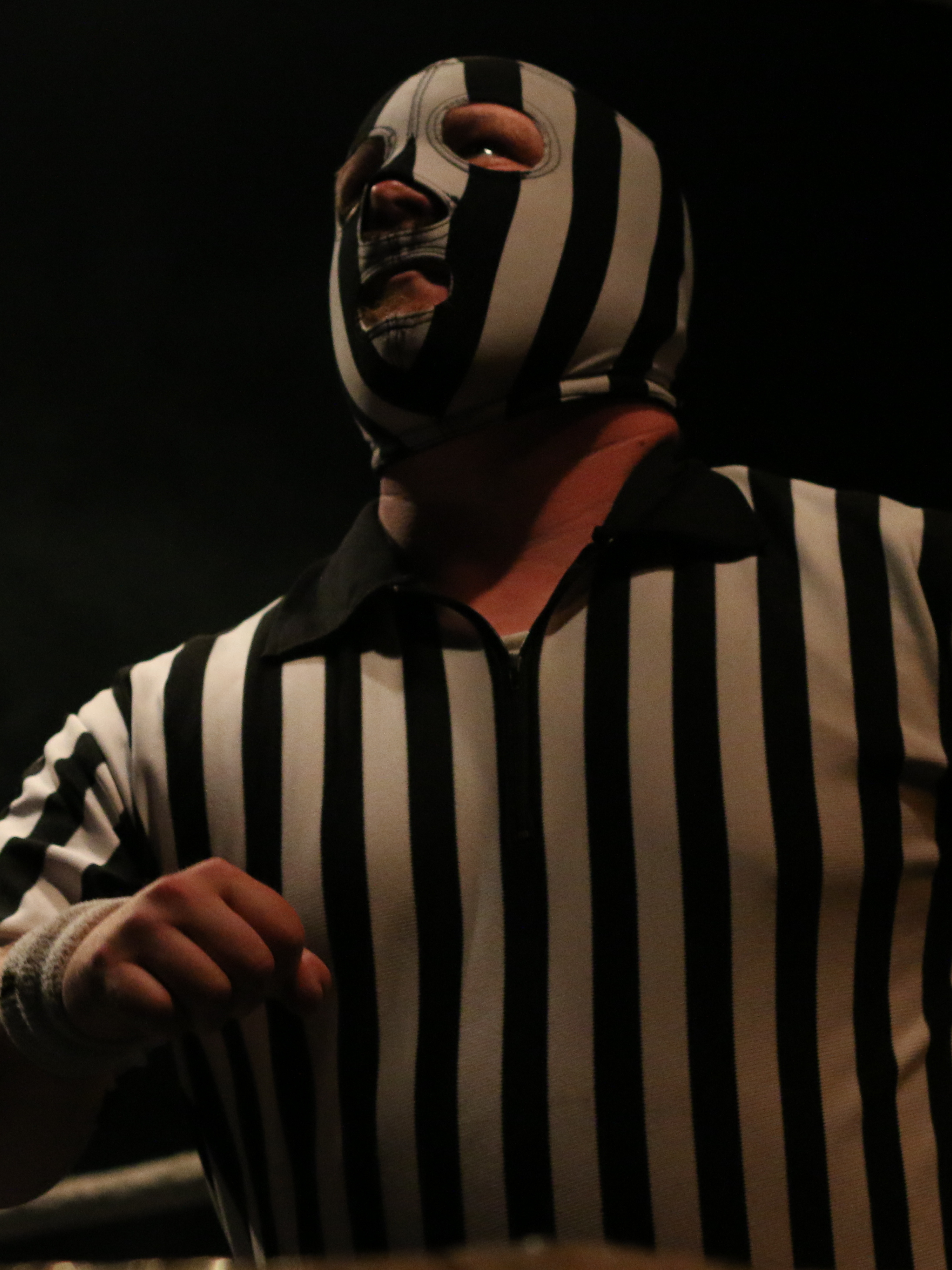
Hoodslam's masked referee El Sparko

Hoodslam was founded by Sam Khandaghabadi, who had been wrestling since the age of 14. She (Note: Khandaghabadi came out publicly as a trans woman during a Hoodslam show in 2019.) called together other wrestlers she had met on the West Coast and convinced them to come to the Victory Warehouse in Oakland, a place where underground metal shows were regularly performed. Although 25 wrestlers were invited to perform on the first show, only 14 wrestlers showed up. Khandaghabadi did not charge admission for any of the first five shows held in 2010.

The gathering continued to be held bi-monthly until May 2011, when people who lived at the Victory Warehouse had parties that got out of control and blamed it on the wrestling. However, in June 2011, slam poet Jamie DeWolf invited Khandaghabadi and the other Hoodslam wrestlers to perform as part of his underground variety art show, Tourettes Without Regrets, at a larger warehouse venue in Oakland, the Oakland Metro Opera House. The popularity of their performance ensured them a regular monthly spot at the Oakland Metro – on the same night as Oakland's First Friday art gathering – which continued to attract large crowds.

In October 2014, for the first time, the 1,000-person venue sold out before the show began.

During the COVID-19 pandemic, Hoodslam was forced into a 17-month hiatus and unable to run shows from Spring 2020 until the Summer of 2021.

In 2023, Hoodslam left its traditional home of the Oakland Metro Opera House and moved to the Continental Club, a nightclub venue in the western part of Oakland.

In late 2025, as part of a storyline reboot involving an alternate timeline, the promotion has since been renamed to SlamTown.

=== Spin-off brands ===
The eventual success of Hoodslam would lead to the creation of several spin-off brands from 2019 onwards, including the LGBT+ and women-orientated show Guilty Lethal Action Mayhem (GLAM) and the cosplay-based Sexy Goodtime Wrestle Show. Another Hoodslam spinoff is Beachslam, which focuses on providing wrestling events in nearby Santa Cruz and Knightsen, California, featuring many of the same performers and characters as Hoodslam – as well as several new, regional or experimental characters.

== Style and characteristics ==
According to Khandaghabadi, Hoodslam, unlike traditional professional wrestling, is a form of performance art: because the wrestlers do not need to appeal to a young audience and do not have to pretend that their act is real, they can unleash their creativity in a more sophisticated way, simultaneously demonstrating their athleticism and poking fun at the absurdity of professional wrestling. Hoodslam wrestler Broseph Joe Brody states that the tagline of the event, "This Is Real", is a tongue-in-cheek reference to the obvious absurdity of the show, which features wrestlers dressed as popular video game characters Ken and Ryu, as well as an "invisible" wrestler, Charlie Chaplin, whom the real wrestlers pretend to battle. Unlike the characters and storylines, however, the physical prowess of the performers is real, and their moves are difficult and dangerous.

As the show unfolds, the performers chant, "fuck the fans", which, according to O.J. Patterson, is a "unifying war chant" that functions as "part reminder not to take things too seriously and part demand for hedonistic excess."

Unlike other professional wrestling shows which play recorded music, Hoodslam frequently features a house band playing live music. Additionally, Hoodslam plays commentary for the matches over the house sound system. While the professional wrestlers take an intermission during the show, it's not unusual for a burlesque act to perform.

In addition to referencing a diverse array of pop-culture characters (besides Ryu and Ken, characters that have featured in Hoodslam include Mortal Kombat's Sub Zero, Johnny "Drinko" Butabi (a reference to the 1998 film A Night at the Roxbury), and Juiced Lee (Bruce Lee)), parodies of other professional wrestlers are frequent in Hoodslam. Hoodslam shows have featured Pooh Jack (A parody of New Jack crossed with Winnie the Pooh), Prawn Cena (John Cena), the tag team of Stoner U (Rick Scott Stoner and Scott Rick Stoner, parodies of the Scott and Rick Steiner, the Steiner Brothers) and Thicc Martel (a parody of "the Model" Rick Martel).

== Notable performers ==
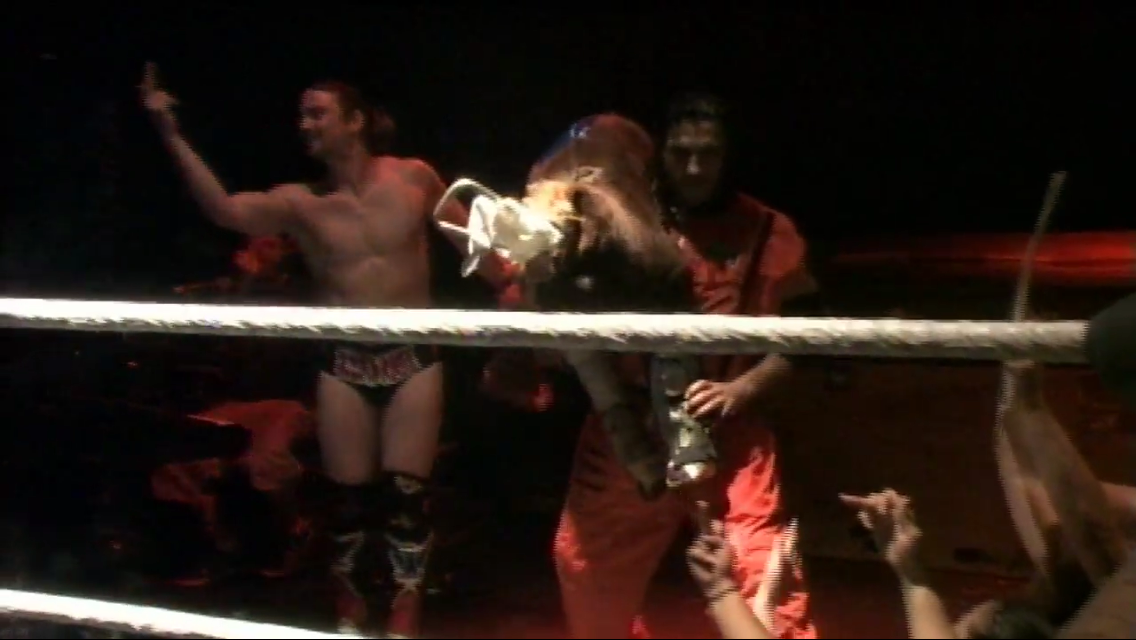
Paul London and Brian Kendrick holding the decapitated corpse of Hoodslam's donkey mascot, Butternuts, at a May 2015 event.

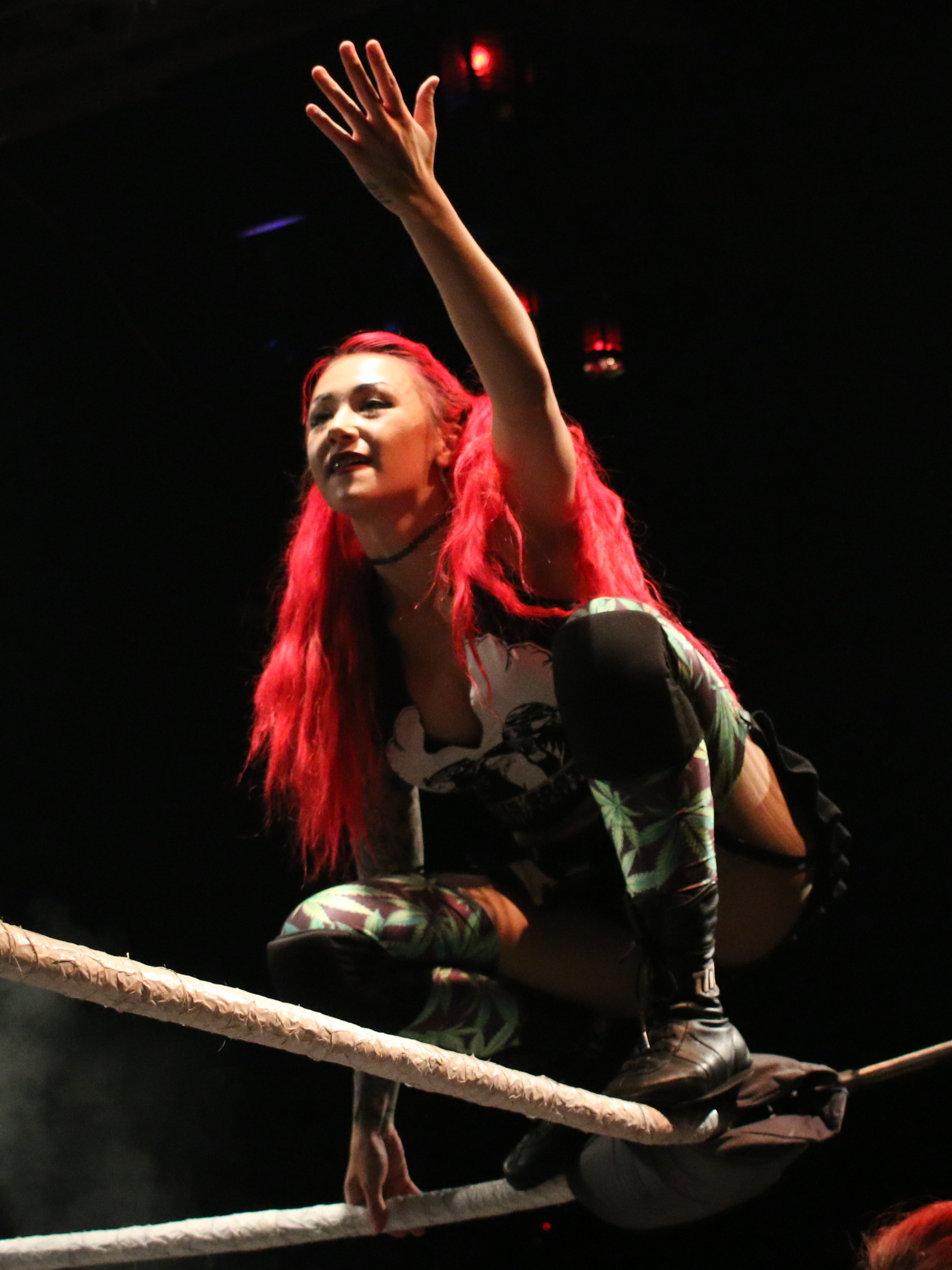
Hoodslam alumna and Oakland native Shotzi Blackheart, who began her professional wrestling career as "Missy Highasshit", a Hoodslam parody of Missy Hyatt

Although local talent are the primary focus of Hoodslam shows, many former WWE and ECW wrestlers have made appearances at Hoodslam since 2013; amongst them have been Brian Kendrick, Paul London, Sinn Bodhi, Shelly Martinez, Gangrel, Sonny Onoo, Lita, Mansoor, and Mustafa Saed.

Additionally, a number of performers such as Drake Younger and Shotzi Blackheart graduated from working in Hoodslam to advancing their careers into WWE.

== Championships ==
=== Current championships ===
As of October 31, 2026

Championship	Current champion(s)	Reign	Date won	Days held	Location	Notes	Ref.
Best Athlete in the East Bay	Kenny K	2	December 6, 2024	694+	Oakland, California	Defeated Keita at Hoodslam EnterTania XV to win the title back.	
GLAMpionship	Mylo	1	December 6, 2024	694+	Oakland, California	Defeated Mighty Mayra at Hoodslam EnterTania. The holder of this championship is considered to be the primary representative of the Guilty Lethal Action Mayhem brand.	
Champion Ship	Jeff The Shark	1	October 4, 2024	757+	Oakland, California	Defeated Mylo in Special Referee Match where the Special Referee was Mighty Mayra, at Hoodslam FTF Mountain. The Champion Ship is not represented by a traditional professional wrestling title belt, but by a literal ship (in a bottle). The holder of the title is being referred to as the Captain.	
Golden Gig Championship	Cereal Man	1	January 3, 2025	666+	Oakland, California	Defeated Dark Sheik, El Chupacabra and Juice Lee in a Four Way match to win the Vacant Championship. The Golden Gig Championship is not represented by a traditional professional wrestling title belt, but by a large replica of a golden razor blade. (Note: In professional wrestling terminology, to "gig" is to cut oneself open and bleed to simulate having suffered a wound during the match.)	
Intergalactic Tag Team Championship	Blood Bond 64 (Anton Voorhees & Richard Shhhnary)	1	December 6, 2024	694+	Oakland, California	Defeated MxM Collection (Mansoor) & (Mason Madden) at Hoodslam EnterTania XV.	

== Critical reception ==
Hoodslam has been seen as a highly accessible and inclusive pro wrestling company in California. According to Stacey Leasca of the Los Angeles Times, "It's loose and wild, a homegrown shot of adrenaline that doesn't just appeal to typical wrestling fans". According to John Moore of ProWrestling.net, "Hoodslam dials both the entertainment and in-ring to 11 leaving new and hardcore wrestling fans captivated and wanting more".

== See also ==
- Incredibly Strange Wrestling – A 1990s professional wrestling promotion based in neighbouring San Francisco featuring a similar absurdist and punk approach to professional wrestling
