= The Very Day =

Studio album by Steve Porcaro
- Released: October 3, 2025
- Recorded: 2008–2025
- Studio: Porcara Musica (Los Angeles); The Metal Building (Nashville); The Village Recorder (Los Angeles); Record One (Los Angeles); Capitol Studios (Hollywood); Vineyard West (Los Angeles); The Blue Corner (Los Angeles)
- Genre: Pop, art rock
- Length: 47:59
- Label: Green Hill Music
- Producer: Steve Porcaro

Steve Porcaro chronology
Someday/Somehow (2016)	The Very Day (2025)

The Very Day is the second studio album by Steve Porcaro. It was announced on July 3, 2025, and released on October 3, 2025.

== History ==
The album is Porcaro's first solo release since Someday/Somehow (2016). Several members of Porcaro's former band Toto perform on the album, including David Paich, Shannon Forrest, Lenny Castro, and Leland Sklar.

The song "Change" was originally written in 2008 with intent for it to be recorded by Michael Jackson. Porcaro commented that the song had "been in the vault a long time. I wrote it during a really charged moment in the world – and somehow, it feels just as relevant now."

== Track listing ==
No.	Title	Writer(s)	Length
1.	"Marilyn"	Steve Porcaro, Stan Lynch	5:35
2.	"Miss Jane Sinclair"	Porcaro, David Kamp	4:22
3.	"Change"	Porcaro, Michael Sherwood, Julius Robinson	5:12
4.	"The El"	Porcaro	1:14
5.	"Does It Really Matter?"	Porcaro	5:44
6.	"Listen to My Heart"	Porcaro, Gardner Cole	4:21
7.	"Water from the Sky"	Porcaro, Marc Bonilla	7:47
8.	"Prelude"	Porcaro	0:43
9.	"2x Lover"	Porcaro, Jude Cole	4:01
10.	"Tonight"	Porcaro, Joo Kraus, Hellmut Hattler	3:57
11.	"Saints and Angels"	Porcaro, Lynch, David Paich	5:03
Total length:			47:59

== Personnel ==
=== Musicians ===
- Steve Porcaro – keyboards, synthesizers, lead vocals (1, 2, 5–7, 10), backing vocals (9)
- Patrick Leonard – string cloud (1)
- Michael McDonald – lead vocals (3), backing vocals (9)
- Jason Scheff – lead vocals (11), backing vocals (1, 2, 7, 9)
- Gardner Cole – lead vocals (6), additional drums (6)
- Jude Cole – lead vocals (9)
- Francesca Falcone – backing vocals (9)
- Weston Wilson – acoustic guitar (11), backing vocals (11)
- Michael Landau – guitar (1–3, 5–7, 9, 10)
- Marc Bonilla – guitar (5, 7, 10)
- Jimmy Haun – guitar (9)
- Scott Van Zen – guitar (11)
- David Paich – Hammond organ (3), additional synths (11), horn arrangements (11)
- Marcus Miller – bass (3)
- Tim Lefebvre – bass (5)
- Hellmut Hattler – bass (10)
- Lee Sklar – bass (11)
- Shannon Forrest – drums (1–3, 5–7, 9, 10)
- Stan Lynch – drums (11)
- Lenny Castro – percussion (1–3, 5–7, 9–11)
- Robin DiMaggio – additional percussion (6)
- Chuck Findley – trumpet (1–3, 9)
- Mark Pender – trumpet (1–3, 9, 11)
- Carl Saunders – trumpet (4)
- Joo Kraus – trumpet (10)
- Joe Sublett – tenor saxophone (1–3, 9, 11)
- Larry Williams – saxophone (1–3, 9)
- Andy Martin – trombone (1–3, 9)
- Jerry Hey – horn arrangements (3)

=== Production ===
- Produced by Steve Porcaro
- Engineered by Bill Schnee and David Davis
- Mixed by Mike Malchicoff (1, 2, 5, 6, 10), Bill Schnee (3, 9, 11), and Mitchell Miller (4, 7)
- Assistant mixing engineer – Paul Matelski (1, 2, 5, 6, 10)
- Mastered by Gavin Lurssen and Reuben Cohen
- Creative director – Heather Porcaro
- Art direction – Heather Porcaro and Nic Taylor
- Artwork – Daniel Martin Diaz
- Coordinator – Mitchell Miller
- Management – Jed Weitzman
