= Kevin Gilbert (musician) =

American musician (1966–1996)

- Gilbert in 1995

Background information
- Born: Kevin Matthew Gilbert; November 20, 1966; Scotch Plains, New Jersey, U.S.
- Died: May 18, 1996 (aged 29) Los Angeles, California, U.S.
- Genres: Progressive rock; industrial rock; pop rock
- Instruments: Vocals; bass; guitar; keyboards; piano; drums; cello
- Years active: 1982–1996
- Website: kevingilbert.com

Kevin Matthew Gilbert (also known as Matthew Delgado and Kai Gilbert; November 20, 1966 – May 18, 1996) was an American singer, songwriter, musician, composer, and producer. He was best known for his solo progressive rock projects, Toy Matinee and his contributions to Tuesday Night Music Club (1993), the debut studio album of Sheryl Crow. Kevin Gilbert was found dead at his Los Angeles-area home on May 18, 1996, at the age of 29.

== Early life ==
Kevin Matthew Gilbert was born in Scotch Plains, New Jersey, on November 20, 1966, and lived in Sacramento and San Mateo, California, where he attended Abbott Middle School and Junipero Serra High School, respectively.

== Career ==
=== 1982–1989: Early years ===
Gilbert was an accomplished composer, singer, producer and instrumentalist who played keyboards, guitar, bass guitar, cello, and drums. In 1982, he and Jason Hubbard formed N.R.G. and in 1984 they released the eponymous album No Reasons Given. Between 1984 and 1987, Gilbert self-released three albums as Kai Gilbert which were later released as a four-CD box set including a CD of miscellaneous tracks recorded at the time that Gilbert recorded the first three albums.

He toured with Eddie Money on Money's Can't Hold Back tour in 1986-87 before entering the 1988 Yamaha International Rock Music Competition with his progressive rock group Giraffe. Although Giraffe placed second to the Australian rock band Janz, Gilbert was considered the popular winner of the night. During that time, he worked on the projects of several established pop musicians including acting as producer on I'm Breathless by Madonna and Changing States by Keith Emerson, and assisting in the studio on Dangerous by Michael Jackson.

=== 1990: Toy Matinee ===
Producer Pat Leonard, impressed with Gilbert's performance at the Yamaha competition, invited Gilbert to join Guy Pratt and himself in forming a new band, which became Toy Matinee. The lone Toy Matinee album was recorded throughout 1989 and released in 1990, which allowed Gilbert to find his voice as a lyricist. The band received no initial promotion or support from the record label and did not tour due to prior commitments of most band members. Pratt joined Pink Floyd as bassist on the A Momentary Lapse of Reason Tour, while Leonard produced and recorded Roger Waters' Amused to Death album in London. With the other band members, guitarist Tim Pierce and drummer Brian MacLeod, already being in demand for session work, that left Gilbert as the only original Toy Matinee member who was both able and willing to tour to boost album sales and make up for the debt.

Consequently, four months after the album's release with virtually no sales, Gilbert convinced the label's promotion department to allow him to take the album on the road. Initially he and guitarist Marc Bonilla (Gilbert worked extensively with Bonilla in the early 1990s) toured local Los Angeles area radio stations in November of 1990, in the process establishing a great relationship with radio legends Mark Thompson and Brian Phelps of The Mark & Brian Show. The growing resonance sparked a demand for them to create a band to play live shows. They attracted bassist Spencer Campbell, drummer Toss Panos, and his soon-to-be-girlfriend keyboardist Sheryl Crow. Leonard expressed no interest in being part of an ensemble which involved replacing so many of the original members.

The first live performance of this touring incarnation was the annual Mark and Brian Christmas Show on December 17, 1990. They did a western U.S. concert tour in the spring of 1991. In later years, three albums related to the band were released: Kevin Gilbert Performs Toy Matinee Live (2010) recorded at The Roxy on May 1, 1991, and Toy Matinee Acoustic (2010) consisting of a compilation of rehearsals in 1990 and three songs recorded at the Ventura Theatre in downtown Ventura, California on April 21, 1991. In 2024, the latter concert was released in its entirety as Troy Manitee: Men Without Pat. The promotional tour ended because of legal action taken by band co-founder Pat Leonard. Gilbert's efforts resulted in the release of two successful singles, "The Ballad of Jenny Ledge" and "Last Plane Out."

=== 1994: Tuesday Night Music Club ===
Gilbert was invited to join the songwriting collective "The Tuesday Music Club" which met at producer Bill Bottrell's studio in Pasadena, California, and which also included Toy Matinee bandmate Brian MacLeod. Gilbert had previously worked alongside Bottrell in the studio for among others Madonna and Michael Jackson. Gilbert introduced his then-girlfriend Sheryl Crow to Bottrell and his fellow Club musicians, and the sessions allowed Crow to workshop new material, leading to the recording of her breakthrough hit debut album, Tuesday Night Music Club. Gilbert co-wrote many of the songs on the album, including 1995 Grammy Record of the Year "All I Wanna Do". Crow later acrimoniously split with most of the musicians in the collective and only producer Bottrell and drummer MacLeod were involved on her follow-up album. Meanwhile, the remainder of the collective worked with singer-songwriters Susanna Hoffs of The Bangles and Linda Perry of 4 Non Blondes on two more albums.

=== 1995: Thud and reforming Giraffe ===
Gilbert continued to work in television and movie soundtracks (under the name Matthew Delgado), studio sessions, and production, and eventually released his first solo album, Thud (1995). He partially re-formed Giraffe to perform the Genesis double album The Lamb Lies Down on Broadway at Progfest '94. Gilbert's manager sent a copy of the recording to Genesis members Tony Banks and Mike Rutherford, who were searching for a new frontman to replace Phil Collins. According to Dave Kerzner in a 2020 interview (who works with Banks and was also a member of Gilbert's band Thud and part of Gilbert's The Lamb Lies Down on Broadway performance), the band said they were "amused" by the performance, but it did not progress beyond that.

=== 1996: Final years ===
Throughout 1996, Gilbert continued recording his The Shaming of the True album (which was completed and released in 2000 by friend and bandmate Nick D'Virgilio and producer/engineer John Cuniberti). He also began a new project with former Toy Matinee bandmate, drummer Brian MacLeod. The project was known as Kaviar. It consisted of numerous collaborators and was notably a sonic departure from Gilbert's previous work, consisting of darker lyrical topics and heavier musicianship. The band's recordings were released posthumously in the form of the album entitled The Kaviar Sessions in 2002, then released again on vinyl and CD in 2022 with the new title Kaviar (which included bonus tracks and remastering).

On May 18, 1996, Gilbert was found dead at his home just outside of Los Angeles. The coroner listed the cause of death as "asphyxia due to partial suspension hanging" concluding that the death was accidental and not a suicide. The manner of death is known as autoerotic asphyxiation, and the Los Angeles County's Coroner's Office reports four or five such deaths a year.

=== 1999–2014: Posthumous releases ===
Several albums of Gilbert's music have been released posthumously, beginning in 1999 with the live album Welcome to Joytown – Thud: Live at The Troubadour (consisting primarily of songs from Thud) and a compilation of Giraffe material on which he had been working.

Gilbert's second solo album, The Shaming of the True (2000), was also released posthumously. The album was largely incomplete, but Gilbert's estate asked Nick D'Virgilio (a former member of Thud, the Giraffe Progfest '94 gig, Spock's Beard drummer, and a close friend of Gilbert's) and producer/engineer John Cuniberti to complete it, based upon the extant tapes and the album planning notes left by Gilbert. After an "industrial" album of music performed by Gilbert's group Kaviar was released in 2002, D'Virgilio performed the entire The Shaming of the True album in concert twice, first at the ProgWest festival in 2002 and again at Whittier College in Whittier, California in 2012.

In October 2009, three new works were released: Nuts, Bolts (collectively both are a body of mostly unreleased songs and mixes released as two individual CD albums) and Welcome to Joytown – Thud: Live at The Troubadour, a DVD/CD which expanded on the original 1999 release. A live performance from Gilbert's promotional group for Toy Matinee was made available in March 2010, and in late 2011 a deluxe expanded release of The Shaming of the True with additional orchestration and engineering by Mark Hornsby was released. In 2012, the two Giraffe albums and 1984's No Reasons Given were re-issued with complete re-mastering from the original analog tapes. A similar expanded release of Thud and a one-time vinyl pressing came out in late 2014.

=== Since 2021: Call Me Kai, vinyl releases, and the KMG Archive Series ===
A box set of the Giraffe albums and a DVD with video footage of the band and their performances was released in early 2021, as well as a vinyl release of The Shaming of the True. A 4-CD box set of Gilbert's earlier work, Call Me Kai, was released also in 2021, along with a CD collection of cover songs Gilbert had recorded over the years.

In early 2022, The Shaming of the True received a final remastering by John Cuniberti for release on vinyl for the first time, and as a CD digipak. In addition, "The Best of Everything" was released as a CD single, featuring the song in three versions. The album The Kaviar Sessions by Kaviar was first released on vinyl in early 2023, simply titled Kaviar and featuring new cover art consisting of only the logo, along with a similarly styled reissue as CD digipak. Original vinyl pressings of No Reasons Given by N.R.G. were also made available in 2023.

In 2022, Gilbert's estate announced the KMG Archive Series, a series of 12 CD digipaks released in pairs, with a run of 300 units per title. They are aimed at fans interested in additional materials sourced from the archives which are deemed unfit to serve as official releases, such as demos, unreleased tracks, alternate mixes, live soundboard recordings, and studio rehearsal sessions. The audio recordings span all eras and most of the formations in which Gilbert performed in his career. In 2025 the estate announced two more releases for the KMG Archive Series a CD and DVD.

- October 25, 2022
  - Vol. 1: N.R.G. – Live at Keystone Palo Alto, California 1982
  - Vol. 2: Kevin Gilbert with Mickey Sorey – Beer Jam 2
- February 21, 2023
  - Vol. 3: Kaviar – Demos, Outtakes & Alternative Mixes
  - Vol. 4: Kevin Gilbert – Thud Acoustic
- December 12, 2023
  - Vol. 5: Giraffe – Live At Cactus Club San Jose, California 1989
  - Vol. 6: Kevin Gilbert – Thud Alternate
- September 17, 2024
  - Vol. 7: Toy Matinee – Troy Manitee: Men Without Pat – Live At Ventura Theater 1991
  - Vol 8: Kevin Gilbert with Steve Watts – Beer Jam 1
- March 8. 2025
  - Vol. 9: N.R.G. - Demos
  - Vol. 10: Giraffe - The View From Here Roughs & Live at The Cabaret
- June 25. 2025
  - Vol. 11: Kevin Gilbert - Thud Live At Rittenhouse Square
  - Vol. 12: Kevin Gilbert - Music To Use Crayons By: Demos Of Questionable Content
- November 21. 2025
  - Vol. 13: Kevin Gilbert - Demos 1982-1985
  - Vol. 14: Giraffe - Live At Puma's & Cactus Club DVD

== Discography ==
=== Studio albums ===
- Decent Exposure (1985)
- Sometimes Why (1986)
- Point Blank (1987)
- Thud (1995)

=== Posthumous studio albums ===
- The Shaming of the True (2000)
- Nuts (2009)
- Bolts (2009)

=== Live albums ===
- Welcome to Joytown – Thud: Live at The Troubadour (1999)
- Beer Jam 2 with Mickey Sorey (2022)
- Beer Jam 1 with Steve Watts (2024)
- Thud Live At Rittenhouse Square (2025)

=== Compilation albums ===
- Mixed Bag (1987)
- Covers (2021)
- Thud Acoustic (2023)
- Thud Alternate (2023)
- Music To Use Crayons By: Demos Of Questionable Content (2025)
- Demos 1982-1985 (2025)

=== Box sets ===
- Call Me Kai (2021)

=== with N.R.G. ===
- No Reasons Given (1984)
- Live at Keystone Palo Alto, California 1982 (2022)
- Demos (2025)

=== with Giraffe ===
- The Power of Suggestion (1988)
- The View from Here (1989)
- Giraffe (1999)
- A 20th Anniversary Performance of the Lamb Lies Down on Broadway (2014)
- Giraffe (2021)
- Live at Cactus Club San Jose, California 1989 (2023)
- The View from Here Roughs & Live at The Cabaret (2025)
- Live at Puma's & Cactus Club DVD (2025)

=== with Toy Matinee ===
- Toy Matinee (1990)
- Toy Matinee Acoustic (2010)
- Kevin Gilbert Performs Toy Matinee Live (2010)
- Troy Manitee: Men Without Pat – Live at Ventura Theater 1991 (2024)

=== with Marc Bonilla ===
- EE Ticket (1991)
- "Mephisto" (1993)

=== with Sheryl Crow ===
- Tuesday Night Music Club (1993)

=== with Kaviar ===
- The Kaviar Sessions (2002; recorded 1996), rereleased with bonus tracks (2023)
- Demos, Outtakes & Alternative Mixes (2023)

=== Guest appearances ===
Title	Release	Contribution	Other artist(s)	Album
(several songs)	1988	Keyboards	Eddie Money	Nothing to Lose
"Back In N.Y.C."	1995	Vocals, bass, keyboards, cello, recorder, producer, engineer	Nick D'Virgilio, Mike Keneally, Toby Holmes	Supper's Ready – A Tribute to Genesis
"Siberian Khatru"	1995	Vocals, keyboards, engineer	Stanley Snail	Tales From Yesterday – A Tribute to Yes
"Suit Canon (Fugue of the A&R Staff)"	1997	Vocals		Giant Tracks – A Tribute to Gentle Giant

== As composer ==
=== Films ===
Year	Name	Notes
1994	Angel 4: Undercover	Role: Cod (credited as Kevin McThespian)
1997	John Farnham: All Kinds of People	Short
1995	My Teacher's Wife	
2001	Moulin Rouge!	co-author of song "Come What May"

=== Television ===
Year	Name	Notes
1991–1992	P.S. I Luv U	13 episodes (as Matthew Delgado)
1991	Dark Justice	6 episodes
1994	Tales From the Crypt	Episode "The Pit"
1994–1996	One West Waikiki	18 episodes (as Matthew Delgado)
