= Toy Matinee =

American rock band with one album released in 1990

Studio album by Toy Matinee
- Released: 28 June 1990
- Recorded: 1989
- Studio: Johnny Yuma Recording, Burbank
- Genre: Progressive rock
- Length: 45:44
- Label: Reprise
- Producer: Bill Bottrell

Singles from Toy Matinee
- 1. "Last Plane Out" Released: 1990; 2. "The Ballad of Jenny Ledge" Released: 1990; 3. "There Was a Little Boy" Released: 1990; 4. "Things She Said" Released: 1990

Professional ratings
Review scores
Source	Rating
Allmusic	3/5 stars

Toy Matinee was a short-lived American rock band, which released one eponymous album on June 28, 1990. Their sound featured an array of influences, including progressive rock, album-oriented rock and pop reminiscent of both the Beatles and the Beach Boys.

== Background ==
Around the end of 1988, Patrick Leonard approached bassist Guy Pratt about forming a band and helping him audition and recruit members, as the two had become friends through working on Madonna's "Like a Prayer" song and I'm Breathless album, and other material previously. Pratt agreed and from then through the beginning of 1989, they recruited singer/lyricist/multi-instrumentalist Kevin Gilbert, drummer Brian MacLeod, and guitarist Tim Pierce to complete the ensemble. Pratt recalls that for various legal reasons he never signed up as a full member of the band despite being in at the start of the project and co-writing half of the songs on the band's only album, which featured guest appearances from other musicians including Julian Lennon. The album was engineered and produced by Bill Bottrell, and released by Reprise Records in 1990.

The album's themes covered a broad ground. The lead single and album opener "Last Plane Out" came from a long-standing fascination Pratt had with the idea of the last flight out of a war zone, and the tracks "Turn It On Salvador" and "Remember My Name" were dedicated to painter Salvador Dalí, and Czech poet and political figure Václav Havel respectively. "Queen of Misery" is about Madonna; Leonard was the singer's longtime songwriting and producing partner, and he and most of the other members of Toy Matinee had worked on Madonna's I'm Breathless album—Leonard as producer/writer/keyboardist, Pratt on bass, Gilbert and Bottrell as producers and engineers, and Pierce on guitar.

== Track listing ==
All tracks are written by Patrick Leonard and Kevin Gilbert, except where noted.

No.	Title	Writer(s)	Length
1.	"Last Plane Out"	Leonard, Gilbert, Guy Pratt	5:12
2.	"Turn It On Salvador" (dedicated to Salvador Dalí 1904–1989)	Leonard, Gilbert, Pratt	4:55
3.	"Things She Said"	Leonard, Gilbert, Pratt	4:58
4.	"Remember My Name" (for Václav Havel)	Leonard, Gilbert, Bill Bottrell	5:16
5.	"The Toy Matinee"	Leonard, Gilbert, Pratt	5:02
6.	"Queen of Misery"		4:30
7.	"The Ballad of Jenny Ledge"		5:49
8.	"There Was a Little Boy"		5:33
9.	"We Always Come Home"	Leonard	4:29
Total length:			45:44

2001 Special Edition additional tracks / 2008 reissue bonus tracks
No.	Title	Writer(s)	Length
10.	"eenitaM yoT ehT"		0:33
11.	"Blank Page"	Gilbert	2:23
12.	"Things She Said" (alternate version)	Leonard, Gilbert, Pratt	5:13
13.	"There Was a Little Boy" (early version)		4:15
14.	"Last Plane Out" (early version)	Leonard, Gilbert, Pratt	5:35
Total length:			63:43

== Release ==
After the album was released, Pratt was touring and MacLeod and Pierce moved on to other session work, and Leonard was not interested in being part of a tour that involved replacing so many of the original members. Gilbert took on that role himself instead, assembling a promotional band for the album which featured Marc Bonilla on guitar and Spencer Campbell on bass. Starting in late 1990, the group engaged in heavy radio promotion wherever possible, most notably frequent appearances on The Mark & Brian Show on Los Angeles-area station KLOS. Eventually they added Toss Panos on drums and Gilbert's soon-to-be girlfriend, Sheryl Crow, on keyboards. There was short tour in early 1991 around the west coast. In 2010, Gilbert's estate released a live recording of this touring band performing at The Roxy on May 1, 1991, as Kevin Gilbert Performs Toy Matinee Live. In 2014, they released Toy Matinee Acoustic, consisting of a compilation of rehearsals in 1990 and three songs recorded at the Ventura Theatre on April 21, 1991, that were mixed to be broadcast on the Westwood One radio network. In 2024, the entire Ventura Theatre concert was released in its entirety as Troy Manitee: Men Without Pat. The promotional tour ended because of a legal action taken by Leonard.

Two of the songs on Toy Matinee—"The Ballad of Jenny Ledge" and "Last Plane Out"—received wide play on AOR stations partly due to Gilbert's promotional work, both of them peaking at No. 23 on Billboard's Mainstream Rock Tracks chart. Despite the chart success of the singles, the album's highest U.S. chart position was No. 129, and sales were enough below expectations that many unsold copies of the CD were widely available as cut-outs in the early 1990s.

Gilbert went on to do additional work with Bottrell, including the Tuesday Night Music Club album with Sheryl Crow, and his debut solo album, Thud. In 1994, Leonard and former Mr. Mister frontman Richard Page released the album Meanwhile as 3rd Matinee. Leonard has revealed that he spoke to Gilbert about doing "another project" shortly before Gilbert's untimely death in 1996, which ended any possibility of a second Toy Matinee album. Retrospectively, Tim Pierce has called Toy Matinee "the greatest band he ever joined," while Guy Pratt has dubbed it "one of the coolest projects he was ever involved with."

=== Surround releases ===
In 1999 the album was remixed into surround by DTS Entertainment by Elliot Scheiner, and released as a DTS encoded 5.1 compact disc with a slightly altered version of the first track, "Last Plane Out". A second DTS version was released in 2001 as a DVD-Audio title, using Meridian Lossless Packing and a 2.0 channel stereo version of the album encoded in Dolby Digital. The 2001 stereo remaster and the 2.0 Dolby Digital version on the DVD-Audio release all include the alternate "Last Plane Out". None of the bonus tracks are included on either surround release.

== Personnel ==
=== Album band ===
- Kevin Gilbert – lead vocals, backing vocals, guitar, keyboards, bouzouki, bass (track 9)
- Patrick Leonard – keyboards, piano, organ, sequencer, backing vocals
- Brian MacLeod – drums, percussion
- Tim Pierce – guitars
- Guy Pratt – bass (all tracks except 9)
- Bill Bottrell – occasional backing vocals, guitar, percussion

=== Additional musicians ===
- Sal's Clarinet Trio
  - Jon Clarke – clarinet (track 2)
  - Donald Markese – clarinet (track 2)
  - Jon Kip – clarinet (track 2)
- Julian Lennon – backing vocals (tracks 2, 3)
- Durga McBroom – backing vocals (track 3)

=== Touring band (1991) ===
- Kevin Gilbert – lead vocals, guitars, bouzouki, keyboards
- Marc Bonilla – guitars, guitar synth, backing vocals
- Spencer Campbell – bass, backing vocals
- Sheryl Crow – keyboards, backing vocals
- Toss Panos – drums

== Production ==
- Produced by Bill Bottrell
- Mixed by Bill Bottrell at Smoketree Ranch (all tracks except 1)
- Mixed by Bill Bottrell and Kevin Gilbert at The Grey Room (track 1)
- Second Engineers – Michael Vail Blum (at Johnny Yuma Recording), Bob Salcedo, Elaine Anderson (at Smoketree Ranch), Micajah Ryan (at The Grey Room)
- Drum Tech – John Good
- Mastered by Steve Hall at Future Disc, Hollywood
- Executive Producer – Patrick Leonard
- Production Coordinator – Ivy Skoff
- Photography by Alastair Thain
- Art direction and design by Jeri Heiden and Deborah Norcross
