= American Matador =

Studio album by Marc Bonilla
- Released: 1993
- Recorded: Track Record; Andora; Alpha; Johnny Yuma; Can-Am; Entourage
- Genre: Instrumental rock, hard rock
- Length: 55:02
- Label: Reprise
- Producer: Marc Bonilla, Michael Scott

Marc Bonilla chronology
EE Ticket (1991)	American Matador (1993)	Celluloid Debris (2019)

Professional ratings
Review scores
Source	Rating
AllMusic	4/5 stars

American Matador is the second studio album by guitarist Marc Bonilla, released in 1993 through Reprise Records.

== Track listing ==
No.	Title	Writer(s)	Length
1.	"American Matador"	Marc Bonilla	4:35
2.	"Get Off the Fence"	Bonilla	3:26
3.	"Streetalk"	Bonilla	3:17
4.	"A Whiter Shade of Pale"	Keith Reid, Gary Brooker	4:56
5.	"The Vanishing Road"	Bonilla	5:11
6.	"Mephisto"	Kevin Gilbert, Bonilla	3:37
7.	"Wake the Baby"	Bonilla	3:35
8.	"Under the Gun"	Bonilla	4:21
9.	"Vette Lag"	Bonilla	4:23
10.	"Prélude"	Maurice Ravel	3:12
11.	"In the Blue Corner"	Jude Cole, Bonilla	4:52
12.	"I Am the Walrus"	John Lennon, Paul McCartney	4:40
13.	"A Whiter Shade of Pale (Inst)"	Reid, Brooker	4:47
Total length:			55:02

== Personnel ==
- Marc Bonilla – keyboards (1–8, 11–13), guitars (1–8, 10–13), mandolin (1), bass (1–8, 11–13), percussion (1), vocals (7), all instruments (9), programming (11)
- James Newton Howard – keyboards (1), acoustic piano (1), orchestration (1)
- Patrick Leonard – acoustic piano (4, 13)
- Mike Keneally – organ (4, 13)
- James DePrato – guitar (8)
- Ronnie Montrose – slide guitar (12)
- Toss Panos – drums (1, 3, 6), percussion (2, 7, 8, 12)
- Troy Luccketta – drums (2, 4, 5, 7, 8, 12, 13)
- Lenny Castro – percussion (11)
- Glenn Hughes – vocals (4)

Production

- Marc Bonilla – producer, art direction
- Michael Scott – producer, engineer
- Jeff Hendrickson – mixing
- Danny Alonso – second engineer
- Chris Danley – second engineer
- John Jackson – second engineer
- Judy Kirschner – second engineer
- Pete Magdaleno – second engineer
- Terry Reiff – second engineer
- Steve Hall – mastering at Future Disc (Hollywood, California)
- Michael Mason – "minister of vibology"
- Pat Dorn – production coordination
- Linda Cobb – art direction
- Karen Miller – photography
- John Singer Sargent – cover painting
- Doug Buttleman Management, Inc. – management
