= Thud (album) =

Studio album by Kevin Gilbert
- Released: 21 March 1995
- Recorded: 1990–1994
- Studios: Lawnmower & Garden Supplies, Pasadena, CA
- Genres: Rock; progressive rock; singer-songwriter
- Length: 50:32
- Label: PRA
- Producer: Kevin Gilbert

Kevin Gilbert chronology
No Reasons Given (1984)	Thud (1995)	Live at the Troubadour (1999)

Professional ratings
Review scores
Source	Rating
AllMusic	4.5/5 stars

Thud is the first studio album by American musician Kevin Gilbert. It was released in 1995, and was his only release before his accidental death in 1996.

== Background ==
The album was recorded from 1990–94 at Gilbert's studio, "Lawnmower & Garden Supplies." The studio's name came from the previous use for the building, including a leftover sign with the name. Many of the songs on the album went through different iterations before the final tracklist was decided. Gilbert said this was in part due to the fact that he did not want to "make another Toy Matinee record" and "do things quite so big and produced as that." Two albums were posthumously released in 2023 showcasing some of these alternate versions, Thud Alternate and Thud Acoustic. Other songs recorded during this period of time were released in 2009 on the albums Nuts and Bolts. In 2015, Gilbert's estate released a 3-disc 20th Anniversary Deluxe Edition of the album, which included the original album remastered, two new discs with 24 songs, and archival photos and other materials. The songs on the new discs consisted of demos and outtakes made during the album's recording.

== Production ==
Gilbert said that the main riff and title of the song "When You Give Your Love to Me" came from Bill Bottrell, and that Gilbert wrote the rest of the lyrics around that phrase. He said that he wrote the lyrics sarcastically about "how beautifully naive and wide-eyed and innocent it is that someone would think that the whole world's going to be a great place to live if he could just get this girl to fall in love with him."

Gilbert said he wrote the song "Goodness Gracious" in 1992, and that it was one of the first things he wrote for the album. He explained that the song was about how "every generation that comes up looks at the generation before it and complains" and that he wanted to illustrate how everyone "has it lowsy" and every generation "has it about the same." He recalled that he got the idea for the title from an episode of The Andy Griffith Show.

During a concert at The Coach House in 1995, Gilbert stated that the song "Tea for One" was first performed in 1991 at Toy Matinee's show at the same venue. He explained that the song came from a story he came up with about a man named Duncan who works at a bagel shop, takes the same subway to and from work every day, and drinks a lot of tea alone at home.

Gilbert said that the song "Waiting" was inspired by an Allen Ginsberg poem that read "I am waiting for wonder to return." The actual poem he was thinking of is titled “I Am Waiting” by Lawrence Ferlinghetti, which has the line “I am waiting for my case to come up [...] and I am waiting [...] for a rebirth of wonder.”

The songs "The Tears of Audrey" and "Song for a Dead Friend" were both inspired by the same situation. The latter was written about the death of one of Gilbert's childhood friends who took his own life, and the former was written about that friend's mother and her grief.

The song "Shrug (Because of Me and You)" was originally an upbeat pop song performed by Gilbert's band Giraffe, known simply as "Because of You." It was first released on the band's 1988 album The Power of Suggestion. It was then altered in 1992 with new vocals and instrumentation. On the final release, only the lyrics were kept from the original version.

== Track listing ==
All tracks are written by Kevin Gilbert, except where noted.

No.	Title	Writer(s)	Length
1.	"When You Give Your Love to Me"	Gilbert; Bill Bottrell	3:20
2.	"Goodness Gracious"		4:08
3.	"Joytown"	Gilbert; Bottrell; Brian MacLeod; Dan Schwartz	4:53
4.	"Waiting"		5:05
5.	"Tea for One"		5:49
6.	"Shadow Self"		7:05
7.	"The Tears of Audrey"		4:47
8.	"Shrug (Because of Me and You)"	Gilbert; Bottrell; MacLeod; Schwartz	3:54
9.	"All Fall Down"		5:35
10.	"Song for a Dead Friend"		5:56
Total length:			50:32

Bonus EP
No.	Title	Writer(s)	Length
1.	"Kashmir"	John Bonham; Jimmy Page; Robert Plant	4:29
2.	"Goodness Gracious (thud version)"		4:09
3.	"Waiting (the other version)"		4:44
4.	"Joytown (recorded live and acoustic for Westwood One Radio)"	Gilbert; Bottrell; MacLeod; Schwartz	4:30
5.	"Shadow Self (alternate version)"		6:47
Total length:			75:11

Some distributions of the album were also co-packaged with a bonus CD entitled "Kashmir & Thud EP" including five additional tracks.

=== 20th Anniversary Deluxe Edition ===
==== Disc 2 ====
No.	Title	Writer(s)	Length
1.	"When You Give Your Love to Me" (demo - recorded 1990–1991)	Gilbert; Bottrell	3:29
2.	"Goodness Gracious" (demo - recorded between January–June 1992)		4:08
3.	"Joytown" (acoustic - from Kashmir EP)	Gilbert; Bottrell; MacLeod; Schwartz	4:29
4.	"Waiting" ("the other version" - from Kashmir EP)		4:46
5.	"Tea for One" (demo mix #1 - recorded 1990–1991)		5:54
6.	"Shadow Self" (mix #2 - recorded between January–June 1992)		6:38
7.	"The Tears of Audrey" (demo - straight - recorded between January–June 1992)		5:17
8.	"Because of You" (demo - recorded 1992)	Gilbert; Bottrell; MacLeod; Schwartz	4:38
9.	"All Fall Down" (dubbed "Toto version" by Kevin - recorded 1990–1991)		5:45
10.	"Song for a Dead Friend" (Guitar Mix)		5:56
11.	"Until I Get Her Back" (intended for Thud, ultimately omitted - recorded between January–June 1992)		5:31
12.	"Big Heart" (intended for Thud, ultimately omitted - recorded between January–June 1992)	Robert Ferris	4:55

==== Disc 3 ====
No.	Title	Writer(s)	Length
1.	"Kashmir" (from Kashmir EP)	Bonham; Page; Plant	4:31
2.	"Miss Broadway" (studio version)		5:20
3.	"Goodness Gracious" (Can-Am version)		4:01
4.	"Joytown" (Full Mix/Unedited)	Gilbert; Bottrell; MacLeod; Schwartz	8:10
5.	"Tea for One" (Sax Mix)		5:48
6.	"Late for Dinner" (Dark Mix)		6:26
7.	"Song for Michael" (demo - recorded 1990–1991)		4:29
8.	"Waking the Sun" (instrumental)	Gilbert; Robert Ferris	3:53
9.	"Tea for One" (instrumental)		5:51
10.	"The Tears of Audrey" (demo - instrumental)		5:40
11.	"Goodness Gracious" (Bottrell Loop Mix)		4:56
12.	"Shadow Self" (Bill's Board Mix)		7:04
Total length:			178:07

== Personnel ==
=== Musicians ===
- Kevin Gilbert – vocals, keyboards, guitars, bass (tracks 2, 4–6), drums (tracks 5, 7), cello
- Brian MacLeod – drums (tracks 1–4, 6, 8, 9)
- Bill Bottrell – backing vocals (track 1), guitar (track 3), pedal steel guitar (track 7)
- Dan Schwartz – bass (tracks 1, 3, 7, 8)
- Lyle Workman – electric guitar (track 2)
- Steve Steinberg – saxophone (track 3)
- Robert Ferris – backing vocals (tracks 4, 6)
- Bruce Friedman – trumpet (track 9)
- Skip Waring – trumpet (track 9)
- Toby Holmes – trombone (track 9)
- Jay Mueller – tuba (track 9)

==== Additional musicians on Kashmir & Thud EP ====
- Kevin Gilbert – vocals, guitars, bass, mic feedback (track 3), foot tambourine (track 4), arrangements (track 1)
- Corky James – guitars (track 1), arrangements (track 1)
- Dave Kerzner – mellotron (track 3), orchestron (track 1)
- Nick D'Virgilio – drums (track 3), percussion (track 4)
- Russ Parrish – guitars (track 3), bass (track 4)
- Satnam Ramgotra – tabla (track 1)
- T.A. Ronn – dobro (track 4)
- Toss Panos – drums (track 1)

==== Additional musicians on bonus discs ====
- Stan Cotey – guitar (disc 2 - tracks 8, 9)
- Nick D'Virgilio – percussion (disc 2 - track 3), vocals (disc 2 - track 3), drums (disc 2 - track 4)
- David Kerzner – mellotron (disc 2 - track 4)
- Russ Parrish – bass (disc 2 - track 3), guitar (disc 2 - track 4)
- T.A. Ronn – dobro (disc 2 - track 3)
- Corky James – guitar (disc 3 - tracks 1, 2)
- Toss Panos – drums (disc 3 - tracks 1, 2)
- Satnam Ramgotra – tabla (disc 3 - track 1)
- David Kerzner – orchestron (disc 3 - track 1)
- Tim Pierce – guitar (disc 3 - track 3)

=== Technical ===
- Produced by Kevin Gilbert; Bill Bottrell and Dan Schwartz (track 7)
- Engineered by Kevin Gilbert; Bill Bottrell and Blair Lamb (track 3, 8)
- Mixed by Kevin Gilbert and Bill Bottrell (track 3)
- Mastered by Eddy Schreyer
- Design – Kevin Gilbert and Mick Haggerty
- Layout – Mick Haggerty
- Cover photography – Herbert List
- Photography – Jeffrey Newbury

==== 2015 deluxe edition ====
- Produced by Wayne Perez
- Executive producer – Jon Rubin
- Remastered by John Cuniberti at Digital Therapy
- Art direction – Hugh Brown
- Photography – Jeffrey Newbury and Hugh Brown

== Trivia ==
- The photography used as the front cover of Thud was taken by famous German surrealist photographer Herbert List.
- Two of the songs on Thud, namely "All Fall Down" and "Shrug (Because of Me and You)", were originally recorded by Giraffe and have been reworked by Kevin for this release.
- The original title of "Shadow Self" is "Late for Dinner," which still appears on the Thud promo release. Gilbert said the track was renamed by mistake in a printing error.
