= Live at the Troubadour (Kevin Gilbert & Thud album) =

Live album by Kevin Gilbert
- Released: September 9, 1999
- Recorded: June 1, 1995
- Venue: The Troubadour (West Hollywood)
- Genre: Rock
- Length: 52:20
- Label: KMG
- Producers: Kevin Gilbert, John Cuniberti and Nick D'Virgilio

Kevin Gilbert chronology
Thud (1995)	Live at the Troubadour (1999)	The Shaming of the True (2000)

Professional ratings
Review scores
Source	Rating
AllMusic	4.5/5 stars

Live at the Troubadour is a live album by Kevin Gilbert & Thud (Gilbert's touring band). It was released on CD by Gilbert's estate in September 9, 1999, then expanded, remastered and rereleased as Welcome to Joytown: Live at the Troubador in 2009 as a CD/DVD with the accompanying live video.

== Track listing ==
All tracks are written by Kevin Gilbert, except where noted.

No.	Title	Writer(s)	Length
1.	"Joytown"	Gilbert; Bottrell; Brian MacLeod; Dan Schwartz	8:32
2.	"Goodness Gracious"		3:41
3.	"Shrug (Because of Me and You)"		4:31
4.	"Waiting"		5:02
5.	"Tea for One"		6:07
6.	"Miss Broadway"		5:19
7.	"The Tears of Audrey"		4:41
8.	"When You Give Your Love to Me"	Gilbert; Bottrell	3:12
9.	"The Ballad of Jenny Ledge"	Gilbert; Patrick Leonard	5:10
10.	"Kashmir"	John Bonham; Jimmy Page; Robert Plant	5:26
11.	"Smash"	Gilbert; Nick D'Virgilio; Russ Parrish	8:00
12.	"Song for a Dead Friend"		5:20
Total length:			50:32

Tracks 7 and 11 are only on the 2009 release.

== Personnel ==
==== Thud ====
- Kevin Gilbert – lead vocals, bass (1–6, 9–11), acoustic guitar (7, 8, 12)
- Nick D'Virgilio – drums, percussion, backing vocals
- Russ Parrish – guitar (1–6, 9–11), bass (7, 8), backing vocals
- Dave Kerzner – keyboards, Novatron
- Satnam Ramgotra – tabla (1, 10), mouth drum (2)

==== Technical ====
- Produced by Kevin Gilbert, John Cuniberti, and Nick DiVirgilio
- Executive producer – Jon Rubin
- Recorded and mixed by Jon Cuniberti
- Mastered by John Cuniberti and Ken Lee
- Design and cover photography – Hugh Brown
- Live photography – Wayne Perez
