= Steve Porcaro =

American keyboardist and composer (born 1957)

- Porcaro in 2026

Background information
- Born: Steven Maxwell Porcaro; September 2, 1957 (age 69); Hartford, Connecticut, U.S.
- Genres: Pop; rock
- Occupations: Musician; songwriter; composer
- Instruments: Synthesizers; keyboards; vocals
- Years active: 1975–present
- Formerly of: Toto; The Chris Squire Experiment
- Spouses: Jeanette Mellin (m. 1977, divorced); Pam Ross (m. 1998; div. 2008)
- Partner: Rosanna Arquette (1980–1983)

Steven Maxwell Porcaro (born September 2, 1957) is an American keyboardist, synth programmer, songwriter, film & television composer, and founding member of the rock band Toto, which he founded with his brother, drummer Jeff Porcaro, and later included their brother Mike Porcaro on bass. He has won three Grammy Awards, including Record of the Year for "Rosanna" and Album of the Year for Toto IV, and three nominations.

Throughout the 1970s and 1980s, the Porcaro brothers were in constant demand as session musicians, appearing on records for artists including Steely Dan, Don Henley, Chicago, Earth, Wind & Fire, Boz Scaggs, Seals and Croft, Warren Zevon, Paul Simon, Yes, and Pink Floyd. He was also a member of Chris Squire's short-lived band, The Chris Squire Experiment, in 1992.

== Early life ==
Porcaro was born in Connecticut. Like his brothers Jeff and Mike Porcaro, Steve started out as a drummer under the tutelage of his father, legendary jazz drummer and educator Joe Porcaro, who played with Frank Sinatra, Stan Getz, Rosemary Clooney, Marvin Gaye, and Madonna and played on hundreds of TV and film scores including: The Wild Bunch, Edward Scissorhands, Dances With Wolves and I Dream of Jeannie. Joe went on to create The Percussion Institute of Technology and later the drum department at the Los Angeles Music Academy.

In 1967, his father bought him an organ made by Rheem. Later his father took him to the Guitar Center to trade in the keyboard for a Farfisa with a Leslie 147 and preamp, which Porcaro called his "first real rig".

== Career ==
Porcaro's career as a touring musician began at the age of 17, playing with Gary Wright on the 1975–76 tour in support of his album, The Dream Weaver. The following year, he joined Boz Scaggs' Silk Degrees tour, along with his brothers Jeff and Mike, future Toto bandmates David Paich and David Hungate, and later Steve Lukather and Lenny Castro.

=== Toto ===
In 1978, Columbia Records released Toto's self-titled debut. The band would go on to become one of the best-selling bands of the era and achieve successful singles such as "Africa", "Rosanna", and "Hold the Line". Their album Toto IV has been certified quadruple platinum in the United States. Porcaro wrote or co-wrote one track on each of Toto's first six albums except for Isolation.

The title of the song "Rosanna" was inspired by Porcaro's then girlfriend, actress Rosanna Arquette. Though she did not directly inspire the song's lyrics, her name fit the song perfectly as described by the song's writer, David Paich, on HBO's Music Box: Yacht Rock: A Dockumentary.

In 1984, Toto composed music for David Lynch's Dune. In 1987, Porcaro left the band to focus on songwriting and scoring, although he accompanied them on their 1988 The Seventh One tour and continued working with them in various capacities, assisting with keyboards, synthesizers, and programming on all the band's albums following his departure.

=== Other work ===
After his departure from Toto, Porcaro composed music and arranged orchestration for such film/TV as Quentin Tarantino and Robert Rodriguez's From Dusk Till Dawn 2: Texas Blood Money, Eddie Murphy's Metro, and Jackie Chan's The Medallion. He also developed music for the television series Justified.

He wrote the song "Human Nature", which appeared on Michael Jackson's Thriller album. The demo of "Human Nature" was sent to Quincy Jones via a cassette tape, which also included a few songs written by Paich. Jones was fielding material from various composers to consider for Thriller and elected to present "Human Nature" to Jackson. Porcaro said that he did not intend for Jones to hear his demo of "Human Nature" and explained that he placed the track on the back of the cassette as he lacked any other tapes to store the song.

From 1982 to 2009, he composed or co-wrote many other songs for Jackson, including "Chicago 1945", "Dream Away", and "For All Time". In 2024, Porcaro sold the rights to all his music to the estate of Michael Jackson and publisher Primary Wave.

In the early 2010s, he had surgery to remove a benign brain tumor, which resulted in him becoming deaf in his left ear.

In 2010, Porcaro returned to play with Toto at live performances when they reformed for a tour in Europe to support Mike Porcaro, who was suffering from ALS. He performed on the band's 2015 studio album Toto XIV, co-writing and singing lead on "The Little Things" and co-writing/singing lead on the Japan-only bonus cut, "Bend". When the band dissolved in 2019 and regrouped in 2020, Porcaro did not return.

In 2018, indie rock band Weezer covered Toto's "Africa", which was prompted by a fan campaign. Porcaro joined the band onstage for a performance on Jimmy Kimmel Live!. In 2024, Porcaro appeared on HBO Original documentary Music Box: Yacht Rock: A Dockumentary.

=== Solo albums ===
Steve released his first ever solo album on June 10, 2016. Someday/Somehow was co-written/produced by Michael Sherwood, former member of the band Lodgic. The album contains 13 songs, one of which reunites Steve with his late brothers Mike and Jeff Porcaro, from recordings made before their deaths. Other performing contributions are from Sherwood, Michael McDonald, Jamie Kimmett, Mabvuto Carpenter, Marc Bonilla, Steve Lukather, Lenny Castro, Jimmy Haun, and Shannon Forrest.

Steve announced his second solo album, The Very Day, on July 3, 2025. It was released on October 3, 2025. It features many collaborators from his last album.

== Equipment ==
Porcaro was a pioneer of synthesis and prominent use of analog synthesizers, including the ARP 2600, Minimoog, Yamaha CS-80, Polyfusion Modular, Yamaha DX-1, Yamaha GS-1, and later digital synthesizers. He has produced and composed synths and drum loops for artists and producers such as David Foster, Quincy Jones, Hall & Oates, Chaka Khan, and Elton John. Porcaro also contributed synthesizer programming with Danny Kortchmar on Don Henley's "Dirty Laundry" and "Boys of Summer".

While touring with Gary Wright in 1975, Porcaro handled the bass duties in Wright's innovative all-synthesizer band. Before a concert, his Minimoog was destroyed after falling from a forklift during stage setup. The band's technician then rebuilt the pieces into a modular synth, controlled by an external keyboard worn on a strap. This was among the first uses of a keytar, an invention which Wright soon desired for himself as he could move around the stage. For touring with Boz Scaggs, Porcaro's rig included a Hammond organ, two Minimoogs, a Prophet 5, and an ARP 2600.

In Toto, Porcaro also used various keyboards during live performances, such as the Wurlitzer 200A in 1979 and Yamaha CP-70 in 1980, sometimes used for covering the piano parts when David Paich was playing organ or synthesizers. Since Paich mostly handled piano duties, it was usually Steve's job to complement the music with creative synth sounds. The synthesizer solo in the Toto song "Rosanna" is the most notable example of this approach. He was known to use various Yamaha synthesizers, including the CS-80, GS-1, DX1, and DX7, as well as others such as the Sequential Circuits Prophet-5, Minimoog Model D, Polyfusion Modular, Roland Jupiter-8, E-mu Emulator, Oberheim Xpander, and Dynacord Add-one.

In later years, he gravitated towards working with software synthesizers. Onstage in the 2010s, he used two Yamaha keyboards (a Montage 8 and a Yamaha Motif XF7) to drive his Apple MainStage-based virtual synth rig, which drew samples from, among others, Logic's ES2 plug-in and Spitfire Audio libraries. He is also a user of Arturia products, and has spoken highly of their synthesizer software, including a demonstration video of the CS-80 V software.

== Personal life ==
His first daughter, Heather Janine Porcaro, was born on June 8, 1978. She was the child of Porcaro and his then wife Jeanette Mellin, whom he met while on tour with Boz Scaggs. He was married to model Pam Ross from 1998 to 2008. They had two children, Dominic (b. 1999) and Micki (b. 2003).

He collaborated with his daughter Heather Porcaro on her debut album, The Heartstring Symphony, released in 2009. Heather was featured in Paper magazine's "Most Beautiful People" issue in 2002.

== Discography ==
=== With Toto ===
- Toto (1978)
- Hydra (1979)
- Turn Back (1981)
- Toto IV (1982)
- Isolation (1984)
- Dune [original soundtrack] (1984)
- Fahrenheit (1986)
- The Seventh One (1988)
- Kingdom of Desire (1992; as session musician)
- Toto XIV (2015)
- Old Is New (2018)

=== Solo releases ===
- Someday/Somehow (2016)
- The Very Day (2025)

=== With other artists ===
- Stephen Bishop – Bish (1978)
- Leo Sayer – Leo Sayer (1978)
- Pablo Cruise – Worlds Away (1978)
- Alessi Brothers – Driftin' (1978)
- Daryl Hall and John Oates – Along the Red Ledge (1978); X-Static (1979)
- Pointer Sisters – Energy (1978)
- Carole Bayer Sager – ...Too (1978), synthesizer on "Peace in My Heart", "You're Interesting" and "I Don't Wanna Dance No More"
- Michael Jackson – Off the Wall (1979), synthesizer programming on "Girlfriend" and "It's the Falling in Love"; Thriller (1982), composed "Human Nature", synthesizers on "Baby Be Mine", "The Girl Is Mine", "Beat It", "Human Nature", "P.Y.T. (Pretty Young Thing)"; Bad (1987), synthesizer programming on "Liberian Girl"; Dangerous (1991)
- Earth, Wind & Fire – I Am (1979)
- England Dan & John Ford Coley – Dr. Heckle and Mr. Jive (1979), synthesizers on "Children of the Half-Light" and "Caught Up In The Middle"
- Boz Scaggs – Middle Man (1980)
- Airplay – Airplay (1980)
- Aretha Franklin – Aretha (1980)
- Al Jarreau – Breakin' Away (1981)
- Donna Summer – Donna Summer (1982)
- Chicago – Chicago 16 (1982); Twenty 1 (1991)
- Don Henley – I Can't Stand Still (1982), keyboards on "Dirty Laundry"; Building the Perfect Beast (1984)
- James Ingram – It's Your Night (1983)
- Al Jarreau – Jarreau (1983)
- Kim Carnes – Café Racers (1983), keyboards on "Young Love"
- Sheena Easton – Best Kept Secret (1983), synthesizers on "I Like the Fright" and "Let Sleeping Dogs Lie"
- Diana Ross – Ross (1983), synthesizers on "Let's Go Up"
- Chaka Khan – I Feel for You (1984)
- Patti Austin – Gettin' Away with Murder (1985), co-writer on "Anything Can Happen Here"; Love Is Gonna Getcha (1990)
- USA for Africa – "We Are the World" (1985), synthesizer programming
- Kenny Loggins – Vox Humana (1985)
- DeBarge – Rhythm of the Night (1985), synthesizers on "Who's Holding Donna Now"
- Cheryl Lynn – Start Over (1987)
- Julio Iglesias – Non-Stop (1988)
- Quincy Jones – Back on the Block (1989)
- Jefferson Airplane – Jefferson Airplane (1989)
- Yes – Union (1991); Open Your Eyes (1997)
- Lionel Richie – Louder Than Words (1996)
- Celine Dion – Let's Talk About Love (1997)
- Michael McDonald – Wide Open (2017)
