= Nuts (album) =

Studio album by Kevin Gilbert
- Released: October 19, 2009
- Genre: Electronic, pop, rock
- Length: 47:48
- Label: The Estate of Kevin Gilbert (KMG 006)
- Producer: Jon Rubin and Kevin Gilbert

Kevin Gilbert chronology
The Shaming of the True (2000)	Nuts (2009)	Bolts (2009)

Nuts is an album by Kevin Gilbert, which was released posthumously in October 19, 2009. It is a collection of unreleased material from Gilbert's career, which was released simultaneously with Bolts.

== Track listing ==
1. "The World Just Gets Smaller" - 5:45
2. "While Heroes Cry" - 3:53
3. "Until I Get Her Back" - 5:22
4. "When Strangers Part" - 3:48
5. "Finally Over You" - 4:19
6. "Circling Winds" - 3:29
7. "Shannon Elizabeth" - 3:10
8. "A Tired Old Man" - 4:20
9. "Childhood's End" - 4:45
10. "Joy Town" (Acoustic Version) - 4:30
11. "Kashmir" (Studio Version, written by Jimmy Page and Robert Plant) - 4:27

== Personnel ==
- Kevin Gilbert – vocals, guitar, bass, piano, keyboards, programming, sequencing
- Russ Parrish – Bass Guitar on "Joy Town"
- Nick D'Virgilio – percussion on "Joy Town"
- T.A. Ronn – Resonator Guitar on "Joy Town"
- Toss Panos – Drum on "Kashmir"
- Corky James– Guitar on "Kashmir"
- Satnam Ramgotra – Goblet Drum on "Kashmir"
- David Kerzner – Synthesizer on "Kashmir"
