= No Reasons Given =

Studio album by Kevin Gilbert and Jason Hubbard as N.R.G.
- Released: 1984
- Genre: Progressive rock
- Length: 78:34
- Producer: Kevin Gilbert, Jason Hubbard

Kevin Gilbert and Jason Hubbard as N.R.G. chronology
No Reasons Given (1984)	Thud (1995)

No Reasons Given is an album by Kevin Gilbert and Jason Hubbard as N.R.G. released in 1984. Most of the music was recorded and produced while Gilbert was still in high school. Several tracks from the extended edition can also be found on Gilbert's Call Me "Kai" box set released in 2021.

== Track listing ==
=== Original album (LP and CD) ===
1. "Morning Light"
2. "Watching Me"
3. "Goodman Badman"
4. "Wings of Time"
5. "Mere Image"
6. "Welcome to Suburbia"
7. "Staring into Nothing"
8. "Frame by Frame"
9. "When Strangers Part"

=== Extended edition (streaming services only) ===
1. "Morning Light"
2. "Watching Me"
3. "Goodman Badman"
4. "Wings of Time"
5. "Mere Image"
6. "Welcome to Suburbia"
7. "Staring into Nothing"
8. "Frame by Frame"
9. "When Strangers Part"
10. "Mephisto's Tarantella"
11. "Masques"
12. "Schizophrenia"
13. "Suitcase Living"
14. "Rain Suite (A. If Ever Rain Will Fall)"
15. "Rain Suite (B. Broken Ties)"

== Personnel ==
- Kevin Gilbert – Lead Vocals, Acoustic Grand Piano, Prophet 5, Gleeman Pentaphonic, Roland Vocoder+, Hammond Organ, backing vocals, 6 & 12 String Guitars, Recorders, Vocal Loop Organ, SCI Drumtracks, Pots and Pans, Production Effects
- Jason Hubbard – Fender Stratocaster, Ibanez Artist EQ, 6 & 12 string guitars, Classical guitar, Roland Juno 60, Backing Vocals, Seiko Digital Percussion, backwards Satanic Messages
- Mickey Sorey – Kit Drums, Simmons SDS5, Tympani, percussion, Laugh

Additional musicians

- Bob Carroll – Lead Vocals, Backing Vocals
- Kevin Coyle – Saxes
- Greg Gilbert – Bassoon
- Jacque Harper – Bass
- Kelly & Kerry Mangini – Backing Vocals
- Ray Otsuka – Violins
