= EE Ticket =

Studio album by Marc Bonilla
- Released: June 1991
- Recorded: Kevin Gilbert's living room in Sherman Oaks, Los Angeles; Johnny Yuma Recording Studios in Burbank, California
- Genre: Instrumental rock, hard rock
- Length: 48:01
- Label: Reprise
- Producer: Kevin Gilbert

Marc Bonilla chronology
EE Ticket (1991)	American Matador (1993)

Professional ratings
Review scores
Source	Rating
AllMusic	3.5/5 stars

EE Ticket is the first studio album by guitarist Marc Bonilla, released in June 1991 through Reprise Records.

== Track listing ==
All tracks are written by Marc Bonilla, except where noted.

No.	Title	Length
1.	"Entrance"	0:46
2.	"White Noise"	3:03
3.	"Mannequin Highway"	4:58
4.	"Commotion" (John Fogerty)	3:44
5.	"Lycanthrope"	5:14
6.	"Hit and Run"	5:05
7.	"Afterburner"	4:29
8.	"Hurling Blues Skyward"	3:36
9.	"Antonio's Love Jungle"	4:13
10.	"Razorback" (Bonilla, Don Frank)	5:20
11.	"Slaughter on Memory Lane"	6:40
12.	"Exit"	0:53
Total length:		48:01

== Personnel ==
- Marc Bonilla – guitars (2–11), guitar synthesizer (3–7, 10, 11), programming (8, 9)
- Keith Emerson – acoustic piano (2)
- Kevin Gilbert – organ (3–5, 10), acoustic piano (4–7, 9–11), clavichord (5–7), Mellotron (6, 8), programming (8, 9), vocals (9), effects (9)
- Ronnie Montrose – slide guitar (10)
- Dave Moreno – bass (2–8, 10, 11)
- Troy Luccketta – drums (2, 4–8, 11)
- Don Frank – drums (3, 10), percussion (3–6, 10), cymbals (8)

=== Production ===
- John Stix – executive producer
- Kevin Gilbert – producer, engineer, mixing
- Steve Gallagher – second engineer
- Steve Hall – mastering
- Eddie Schreyer – mastering
- Future Disc (Hollywood, California) – mastering location
- Marc Bonilla – cover design
- Paul Bonilla – paintings
- Taylor King – front cover photography, color photos
- Michael Tweed – back cover photography, black and white photos
- Flash Bonilla – bedroom photo
- Doug Buttleman Management, Inc. – management
