= The Ruckus Revival =

Performance art show in Oakland, California, USA

The Ruckus Revival (formerly known as Tourettes Without Regrets) is an underground variety show and performance art event in Oakland, California. Founded in 1998, Ruckus is hosted by MC, poet, and filmmaker Jamie DeWolf, and comedian Wonder Dave. Other hosts include Hunny Bunny aka Christina Lowery, the first female cohost who hosted and performed burlesque and contortion from 2001 to 2021. It has been presented regularly at the Continental Club in Oakland. Incorporating circus, stand-up comedy, rap battle, poetry slam, burlesque, and other variety show elements, the event includes audience participation and has open mic components, billing itself as "the Fight Club of underground art."

== Development ==
After being banned from local open mics in his hometowns of Benicia and Vallejo for his raw subject matter, poet DeWolf created Tourettes Without Regrets to showcase unfiltered slam poetry performances. DeWolf does not have Tourette syndrome, although he told KALW that "I've been accused of having Tourette's ever since I was a young child." In an interview with Oakland Magazine, DeWolf comments, "I actually did it as a double form of revenge. I couldn't read anywhere in my hometown. They would kick me out, because of pieces about self-mutilation. I didn't really like the vibe of poetry and open mics then. I just couldn't believe how stale they were. It's supposed to be hot expression, people taking the straightjacket off and busting their skills, and that didn't exist. I vowed—swore revenge—I would make a show that would be a thwart-them-all kind of thing."

== Notable performances ==
=== Freestyle rap ===
Andrew Bancroft, also known as MC Jelly Donut, has taken on battle-rap opponents at Tourettes many times. Bancroft performs dressed in a jelly donut costume and personifies a donut in his rap battles. When asked what kind of jelly donut he is, Bancroft says in an interview by Gelf Magazine, "That's the eternal question, really. I usually got some pink coming out the side. It's like mood changes for me—my insides can change. But there's definitely a hint of raspberry in there most of the time. But sometimes on particularly bright days I'll be lemon, other days, I don't know, I could be peanut butter fluffernut sandwich or something." Bancroft was a performer with San Francisco sketch-comedy troupe Killing My Lobster, also performed regularly with Kenny Taylor as the comedy collective, Illbilly Productions.

The Saurus maintained a nine-month winning streak at Tourettes Without Regrets before returning to the 2007 World Rap Championships with Illmaculate and winning first place. He has a reputation for multi-syllabic rhymes and witty comparisons and is rumored to have a photographic memory. The Saurus won first place at Scribble Jam, becoming the first champion from California in Scribble’s 11-year history.

=== Comedy and poetry ===
Post-modernist comedian Brent Weinbach performed alongside beatbox champion Infinite in July 2008. Infinite performed his piece entitled The Tell-Tale Heart. Based on the gothic tale by Edgar Allan Poe, this spoken-word poem mixes 19th-century elocution with modern hip-hop slang.

San Francisco-based absurdist and controversial comedian Will Franken has performed at Tourettes Without Regrets several times. In 2009 he performed a 40-minute set, and he appeared again in January 2011.

Bay Area native George Watsky poet and actor whose YouTube hit Pale Kid Raps Fast went viral returned to the Tourettes stage in November 2011 for the first time in many years. For him, it was a homecoming; he had stage-managed there when he was only 15. “I was the only sober person in the room to count the money,” said Watsky, who likened himself to a boy scout.

=== Other acts ===
In June 2011, Jamie DeWolf invited Sam Khandaghabadi and other wrestlers to perform at Tourettes; this was the inaugural performance of Hoodslam at the Oakland Metro Opera House, which has since become its own show, recurring monthly on the Friday after Tourettes.

On April 5, 2012, Butterscotch Clinton performed at Tourettes alongside Syzygy in a beatboxing duet. Butterscotch also performed at Tourettes on October 6, 2011. Butterscotch is an internationally recognized vocal/beatbox artist, most popularly known from her appearance on NBC's "America's Got Talent" as a finalist. Ellen DeGeneres was so impressed with her skills she invited Butterscotch to perform on her show where she amazed the crowd singing, playing the piano and beatboxing. Prior to America’s Got Talent, Butterscotch claimed titles as both the first International Female Beatbox Battle World Champion and the West Coast Beatbox Champion for both genders. Butterscotch has made such an impact on young women, she was even the inspiration of a teenage girl to be transformed into a beatboxer on MTV’s MADE.

== Press ==
NBC Bay Area Tourettes Without Regrets in Oakland

The East Bay Express Reader's Poll awarded the show "Best Underground Cultural Event" in 2011

KQED covered the show in 2008 in their Performance Review section, "...what Tourette's brings is a ritual as practiced and intricately designed as high mass, the deepest concentration of raw talent you're likely to see in a monthly night in the Bay, and horsepower."

The Huffington Post covered the viral 'F*ck Chick-Fil-A' Video: Tourettes Without Regrets Stages Chicken Sandwich Lap Dance Protest' in which DeWolf "staged a lap dance contest involving gay, lesbian and straight couples...and an unsuspecting Chick-Fil-A sandwich." In the video footage, DeWolf announces, "Ladies and gentlemen, to add to the national debate, we will have a "f*ck this chicken sandwich contest. Let's show them how the Bay Area really feels about this conversation."

Oakland North describes the show as "...a raunchy, attention-deficit vaudeville extravaganza of lewd audience contests, dirty haiku battles, and more euphemisms for male genitalia than you could shake a stick at."

Oakland North also published an article about the 2010 Mother's Day show, commenting, "DeWolf is the mad scientist running the raunchiest, dirtiest, most hilarious variety show ever. As an emcee, he is more than a surly provocative ring master, he is an experimenter extraordinaire trying to generate enough spark to get the incubation process accelerating."
