= Jamie Kimmett =

Christian music singer

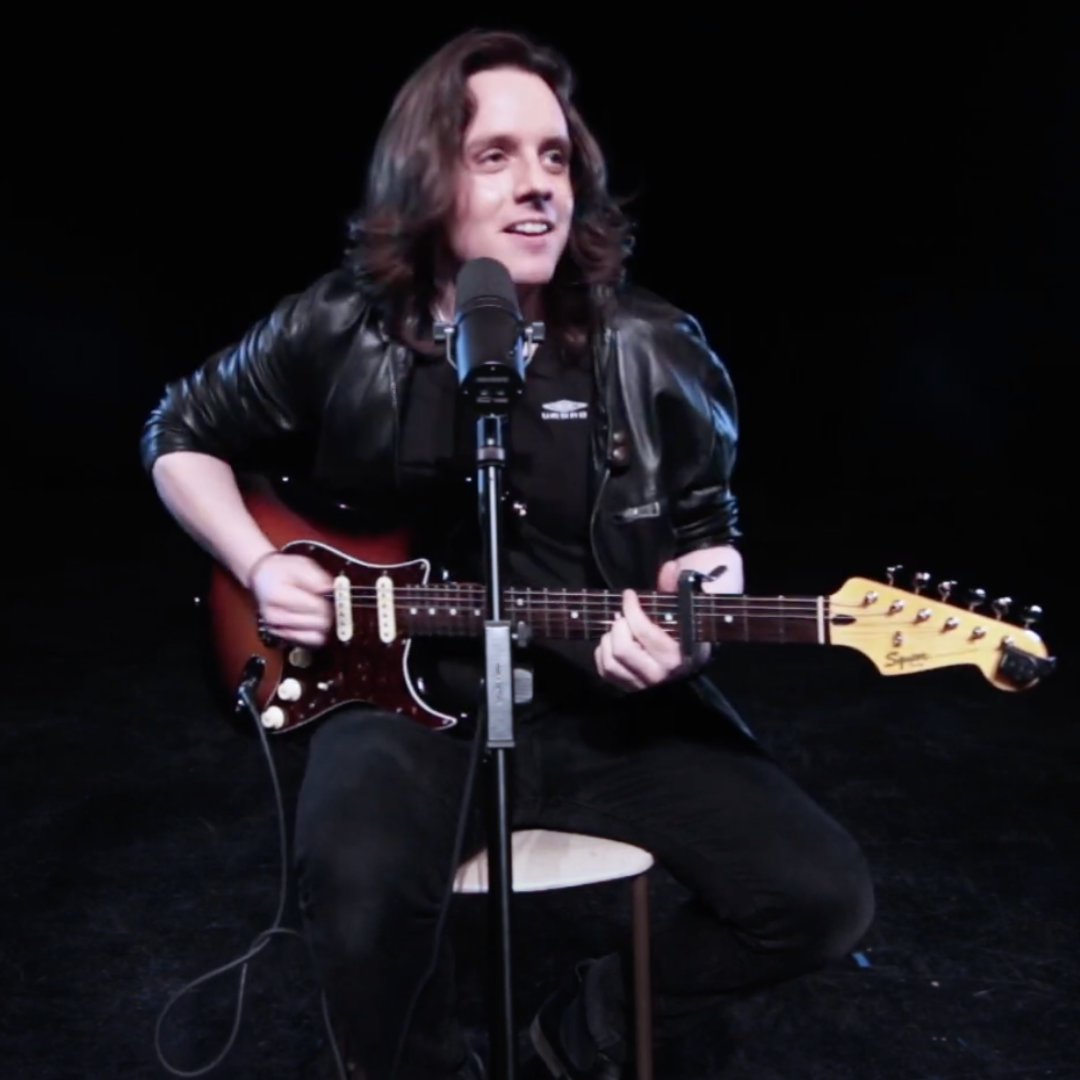
- Jamie Kimmett live in Ayrshire, Scotland.

Background information
- Born: Kilmarnock, Scotland
- Genres: Christian, Pop
- Occupation(s): Singer, songwriter
- Instrument(s): Vocals, guitar
- Years active: 2015–present
- Labels: Provident Label Group
- Website: www.jamiekimmett.com

Jamie Kimmett is a Christian music singer-songwriter signed to Provident Label Group under Sony.

== Career ==
Jamie Kimmett was born in Scotland. He grew up listening to artists like Michael Jackson, Stevie Wonder, and John Mayer. While studying to be a pastor in the UK, Kimmett decided to head to Nashville to pursue a Christian music career. Within a few weeks he was signed to Provident Label Group.

Kimmett has since toured with artists including Zach Williams, Matt Maher, Casting Crowns, and For King & Country. He co-wrote four songs with Toto's Steve Porcaro on his 2016 solo album Someday/Somehow, performing on the tracks "She's So Shy" and "Face of a Girl". He released his debut single, "Prize Worth Fighting For" on 14 December 2018. The song became his first Billboard charting song, reaching #10 on Christian Airplay.

== Discography ==
=== Singles ===
| Year | Single | Chart Positions | | | Album |
| Year | Single | US Christ | US Christ Air | US Christ AC | Album |
|---|---|---|---|---|---|
| 2018 | "Since I Met You" | — | — | — | Prize Worth Fighting For |
| 2018 | "Prize Worth Fighting For" | 12 | 10 | 6 | Prize Worth Fighting For |
| 2019 | "Burdens" | — | 37 | 26 | Prize Worth Fighting For |
| 2019 | "Love Your Neighbor" | — | — | — | Prize Worth Fighting For |

=== Extended plays ===
| Year | Title | Chart Positions |
| Year | Title | US Christian |
|---|---|---|
| 2019 | Prize Worth Fighting For | 23 |
