= Janz (band) =

- Origin: Melbourne, Victoria, Australia
- Genres: Funk, pop
- Years active: 1988–1990
- Label: CBS

Janz were an Australian funk, pop band formed by David Janz (or Jaanz) on lead vocals in 1988. Other original members were David Carr on guitar, Debbie Lavell on backing vocals, Phil Martin on bass guitar, Robert Parde on keyboards and Miles Stewart-Howie on drums. They won the 1988 Yamaha International Rock Music Competition in Japan for "Crime", which was co-written by Janz and Parde.

The group supported Womack & Womack on the Australian leg of their Celebrate the World tour in May 1989. The Australian Jewish News' Lahra Carey caught their performance at Melbourne's Metro Club and felt the support act were "far more uplifting" by presenting "energy and ap peal." "Crime" was issued as Janz' debut single in June and reached No. 40 on Australian singles chart. In October they issued their second single, "Picture", with the line-up of Janz, Martin, Stewart-Howie and Vinnie Denmore on guitar.

After disbanding the group's lead singer operated the David Jaanz School of Singing as a vocal coach. Parde continued as a songwriter and co-wrote Vanessa Amorosi's "Shine" and Tina Arena's "Wasn't It Good". Phil Martin continued writing music and later had a solo project Phil Martin’s Drive. Martin worked with David Carr in Carr’s studio, Rangemaster. Together they co-produced Martin's songs. Martin was signed to Melodic Records. By 2009 Jaanz worked with Michael Parisi to form Dream Incorporation as a talent management and artist development business, which ran workshops for aspiring musical artists. Jaanz released a gospel album, My Child, in April 2020.

== Members ==
- David Carr – lead guitar
- David Janz – lead vocals
- Debbie Lavell – backing vocals
- Phil Martin – bass guitar, vocals
- Robert Parde – keyboards, vocals
- Miles Stewart-Howie – drums, percussion
- Vinnie Demore – guitar

== Discography ==
- "Crime" (1989) - CBS Aus No. 40
- "Picture" (1989) - CBS
