= Bolts (album) =

Studio album by Kevin Gilbert
- Released: October 19, 2009
- Genre: Electronic, Pop, Rock
- Length: 42:27
- Label: The Estate of Kevin Gilbert (KMG 007)
- Producer: Jon Rubin and Kevin Gilbert

Kevin Gilbert chronology
Nuts (2009)	Bolts (2009)

Bolts is an album by Kevin Gilbert, which was released posthumously in October 19, 2009. It is a collection of unreleased material from Gilbert's career, which was released simultaneously with Nuts.

== Track listing ==
No.	Title	Length
1.	"Waking The Sun"	3:44
2.	"Jenny Ledge (Acoustic)"	4:44
3.	"Something Nice for My Dog"	3:16
4.	"Souvenir"	4:06
5.	"God's Been Tapping My Phone"	3:54
6.	"Goodness Gracious (Acoustic)"	3:57
7.	"The Best of Everything"	4:58
8.	"Blank Page"	2:23
9.	"Taxi Ride"	4:07
10.	"Lonely Road"	5:25
11.	"Finale"	1:53
Total length:		42:27

== Personnel ==
- Kevin Gilbert – vocals, guitar, bass, piano, keyboards, programming, sequencing
- Nick D'Virgilio – percussion on "Something Nice For My Dog" and "Goodness Gracious"
