= Toss Panos =

Greek-American drummer (born 1964)

- Born: Anastasios Panos; February 14, 1964; Athens, Greece
- Genres: Progressive rock, jazz fusion, pop, rock
- Instrument: Drums
- Years active: 1983–present

Anastasios (Toss) Panos is a Greek-American drummer who has played or recorded with Dweezil Zappa, Sting, Steven Stills, Paul Rodgers, Michael Landau, Robben Ford, Toy Matinee, Larry Carlton, Jude Cole, Mike Keneally, John Goodsall, Steve Vai, Mark Hart, Mel Torme, Peter Himmelman, Andy Summers, Cliff Richard, Vonda Shepard and Eric Burdon. He is also the owner of Tossimos Recording Studio.

== Early life ==
Panos was born in Athens, Greece. He moved to San Diego, California at age two. At age seven, Toss started learning the drums by playing along to songs that he heard on the radio. He grew up listening to The Ohio Players, James Brown, Elton John and Joni Mitchell. His early influences included Mitch Mitchell and Eric Burdon and The Animals. By age ten Toss was playing gigs at Greek nightclubs on the weekends.

== Career ==
At age 19 he left San Diego and began studying at the Musicians Institute in Los Angeles where Joe Porcaro would be one of his first teachers. After his graduation, Toss was offered a teaching position there which he accepted.

His early gigs included working with guitarist Ike Willis, a long time member of Frank Zappa's band, until he was invited to audition for Toy Matinee's touring band in the early 90s. He brought a tape of him playing with The Fire Merchants to the audition and immediately got the gig. After Toy Matinee ended, he would continue working with Kevin Gilbert live and in the studio where he played drums on his cover version of "Kashmir". In 1994 Kevin would produce Fire Merchant's "Landlords of Atlantis" album.

At the same time Toss performed on jingles, movies and on The Dennis Miller Show and The Roseanne Show.

In 2000 Toss joined Michael Landau's band for a series of live and studio performances. Around that time he also met Robben Ford, with whom he collaborated on two albums, "Truth" and "Soul on Ten". In 2004, he connected with Robi Draco Rosa for a series of live shows and album recordings. His most recent project "Shogun Warrior" with Jeff Babko went on indefinite hiatus in 2012.

Currently Toss Panos is part of Galactic Booty Co., made up of Satnam Ramgotra on percussion, and Curt "Kirkee B" Bisquera on drums.

== Discography (restricted) ==
- Mike Keneally - Hat (1992)
- Marc Bonilla - American Matador (1993)
- The Fire Merchants - Landlords of Atlantis (1994)
- Kevin Gilbert - Thud (1995)
- Mike Keneally - Sluggo! (1998)
- Michael Landau - The Star Spangled Banner (2001)
- Michael Landau - Live 2000 (2001)
- Frank Gambale - Resident Aliens: Live Bootlegs (2001)
- Faith Hill - Cry (2002)
- Bryan Beller - View (2003)
- Robi Draco Rosa - Mad Love (2004)
- Robi Draco Rosa - Como Me Acuerdo (2004)
- Robi Draco Rosa - "Draco Al Natural" (2005)
- Robi Draco Rosa - "Draco y El Teatro Del Absurdo" (2007)
- Robi Draco Rosa - "Draco Rosa Teatro Live" (2008)
- The Michael Landau Group - Live (2006)
- Tom Heasley - Passages (2007)
- Robben Ford - Truth (2007)
- Bryan Beller - Thanks in Advance (2008)
- Robben Ford - Soul on Ten (2009)
- Kevin Gilbert Performs Toy Matinee Live (2010)
- Keith Emerson - Three Fates Project (2013)
- Steve Lukather - Transition (2013)
