= Jamie DeWolf =

American slam poet and spoken word comedian

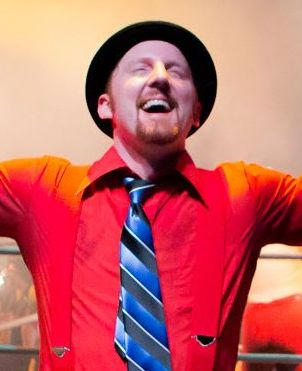
- Dewolf performing at Tourettes Without Regrets in 2013
- Born: Jamie Kennedy; October 28, 1977 (age 49); Eureka, California, U.S.
- Known for: Slam poet, spoken word, comedian, storyteller, showman, filmmaker
- Relatives: Ronald DeWolf (grandfather); L. Ron Hubbard (great-grandfather); Margaret Grubb (great-grandmother)
- Awards: 2003 San Francisco Bay Guardian "Best of the Bay" award
- Website: jamiedewolf.com

Jamie DeWolf (born October 28, 1977) is an American slam poet, film director, writer, spoken word artist, and circus ringmaster from Oakland, California.

DeWolf is known for his career as a slam poetry champion, his award-winning films for the Youth Speaks Bigger Picture Project, live tours with the performance trio The Suicide Kings, hosting the monthly variety show The Ruckus Revival (formerly known as Tourettes Without Regrets) in Oakland, and for his work as a producer and performer on NPR's Snap Judgment. DeWolf has appeared on HBO's Def Poetry, 60 Minutes, UPN, Inside Edition, and CBS. He directed, wrote, and starred in the feature film Smoked. The Movie (2012).

He is the great-grandson of author and Scientology founder L. Ron Hubbard and an outspoken critic of the Church of Scientology. In 2000 he hosted the first ever anti-Scientology summit in Clearwater, Florida. He was named one of the "Top 25 People Crippling Scientology" by The Village Voice in 2011.

== Early life ==
Born in Eureka, California as Jamie Kennedy, he took his mother's maiden name 'DeWolf' in 2006 to avoid confusion with actor and fellow comedian Jamie Kennedy. DeWolf is the great-grandson of L. Ron Hubbard and the grandson of Hubbard's son Ronald DeWolf (né L. Ron Hubbard Jr.).

DeWolf was raised Baptist and was a self-described "hardcore Christian kid" who hoped to become a minister. At the age of six, his pastor handed him a book titled The Kingdom of the Cults. It referred to contemporary religious movements, one of which stuck out: Scientology, founded, to his surprise, by his own great-grandfather, L. Ron Hubbard. DeWolf became fascinated with his ancestor's legacy, reading his books and citing Hubbard as his inspiration to become an artist. He has said he idolized Hubbard as a child and often asked his mother why he couldn't meet him, and that, before he knew Hubbard had founded a religion, Hubbard's books showed him that "you could be a writer simply by your will alone".

Hubbard was already in hiding by the time DeWolf was born, and DeWolf was told not to ask his grandfather, L. Ron Hubbard Jr., about him. Hubbard Jr., born in 1934, grew up during the founding of Scientology and worked in the organization for a time, but later publicly disputed his father's accounts of himself. As a child, DeWolf was intensely religious, passing out pamphlets on street corners warning of the apocalypse, yet he entered adolescence feeling alone and troubled, describing a "toxic Molotov cocktail" simmering inside him.

He was often sent to the school psychiatrist over the macabre nature of his writing. He has said that what drew him to Christianity was a fascination with demonology and the apocalypse, and that he had read the Book of Revelation "10,000 times" by the age of ten. In the late 1990s he began reciting poetry at open microphones in the bedroom communities of Benicia and Vallejo, where, he has said, his "fire and blood" material was not welcome.

== Slam poetry ==
He found himself going to open-mic sessions, but it was only when he discovered poetry slams that he came into his own. He has said that slams were "the only place that people wouldn't kick me out; they would just give me low scores". He credits the competition with making him a better poet and with teaching him how his words could set the mood of an entire room. He has also said that the small-town open-mic scene in Vallejo and Benicia changed his life. He has described poetry and spoken word as an outlet for raw, confessional material, where a performer has no props and is left with "just you and your ghosts".

Since his first slam in 1999, DeWolf has been on seven slam teams, reaching the finals stage of the National Poetry Slam with his first. He has since become a National Poetry Slam Champion, the Berkeley Grand Slam Champion, and a Youth Speaks mentor. He has appeared on HBO's Def Poetry Jam, hosted by Mos Def, performing his poem "Grim Fairy Tale" in season three and taping for season five with Dave Chappelle and Lauryn Hill. Oakland Magazine described his style as "raw and raucous" and said he brings the same avant-garde approach to poetry, playwriting, performance, and filmmaking.

At the same time he began slamming, DeWolf started teaching slam in high schools. He has said this gave him "a driving force" to help kids like himself, and made him realize he had "chosen art as an escape route". He argues that young people are too seldom encouraged to express themselves authentically, and that bringing slam poetry to them empowers them to think about what they want. Since his slam beginnings, DeWolf has performed and led writing workshops at over 90 universities, high schools and juvenile detention centers across the globe, working with such organizations as Opera Piccola, Lunchbox International, and Youth Speaks.

In 2001 the San Francisco Chronicle characterized DeWolf as "a nationally recognized slam poet". His work has been featured on 60 Minutes, UPN and NPR. He coached the Youth Speaks team twice, one of which was featured on Brave New Voices on HBO hosted by Common and Rosario Dawson. He opened for B. Dolan on the first Church of Love and Ruin tour and for Shane Koyczan, and was featured in 2014 on All Def Poetry with his poem "Rebels Without Applause". He was awarded the East Bay Express Best of the Bay "Best Poet" twice, in both 2012 and 2013.

== The Suicide Kings ==
As a member of The Suicide Kings performance trio (with Geoff Trenchard and Rupert Estanislao), DeWolf toured the country performing and teaching writing workshops at colleges, high schools, poetry slams, and juvenile detention centers. In 2006 they received funding from the National Performance Network Creation Commission, The Zellerbach Family Foundation, and the City of Oakland to write In Spite of Everything, which premiered at the Oakland Metro, then moved to the EXIT Theatre in San Francisco, eventually touring nationwide and to Moscow. It has been described as "a poignant, chilling knockout of a play ... that beautifully incorporates their visceral verse into the brutal narrative to a school shooting." and "an eight-minute crime caper about the Columbine shootings in reverse." The play was showcased at the Hip Hop Theater Festival in 2007 and was chosen as one of the "top ten" plays of the year by East Bay Express the same year.

The trio performed worldwide at colleges, high schools, juvenile detention centers. In 2004, they toured with Sage Francis and Doomtree on the Abusement Tour.

== The Ruckus Revival (Tourettes Without Regrets) ==
In 1999 DeWolf founded the monthly variety show Tourettes Without Regrets, which blends poetry slam, freestyle battle, and what its website called "psychotic erotic vaudeville". Commonly known as "the fight club of underground art", it is a showcase for eccentric Bay Area performers. Typical programming has included burlesque, dirty haiku tournaments, rap battles, spoken word, and stand-up comedy. DeWolf has likened hosting it to "being a reverse cult leader", openly wanting to "brain wash you for your own entertainment". He has said that what makes the show unique is "throwing all of these elements together and seeing what happens".

For many years the Tourettes show changed venues, and by 2011 was held at the Oakland Metro Operahouse, a warehouse venue, where Oakland North called it a "raunchy, attention-deficit vaudeville extravaganza". A 2008 KQED piece described a format mixing variety and game show, with slam judges introducing themselves by mimicking animals, a beatboxing duo, and a burlesque troupe performing a Snow White strip-tease. The annual "F*ck Valentines Day Spectacular" has featured sex toy giveaways, interpretive dances based on worst sex experiences, a contest for the audience member who survived the worst ex, and prank calls to former lovers.

SF Weekly called it "one of the wildest and most creatively raw variety shows in the Bay Area". It spawned spinoff events, including an annual Game of Thrones show in which the audience is divided into Starks and Lannisters and plays interactive games to decide characters' fates and rewrite the show's ending. A live "choose your own adventure" band performed new material inspired by the series. Other spinoffs include the Holy Sh*t Show, which lampoons Scientology, and the yearly XXX Show, which began in 2012 at the Mitchell Brothers O'Farrell Theater. The show has won "Best of the Bay" multiple times from the East Bay Express, SF Weekly, and the San Francisco Bay Guardian.

On December 3, 2020, DeWolf announced that this would be the final Tourettes Without Regrets and the monthly show would continue under the name Ruckus and Rumpus Revival.

== Performance ==
Beyond his work with spoken word poetry, DeWolf has established himself as a showman and performer in the San Francisco Bay Area. He appears as the regular host for not only Tourettes Without Regrets, but annual festivals such as The East Bay Express Film Awards, Briefs Erotic Short Film Festival, Scream Film Festival, The Folsom Street Fair, and the Sacramento Horror Film Festival. DeWolf worked as a producer for Oakland-based NPR's Snap Judgement, where he produced a number of stories, and performed several of his own, including The God and the Man, which drew international attention, and The Girl in the Hallway, chronicling the tragedy of Xiana Fairchild, who at age 7 in 1998 was snatched off the street and killed while she lived in the same apartment building as DeWolf.

== Smoked the Movie ==
In 2006, DeWolf began filming Smoked. The Movie, a feature-length crime caper set in Oakland. The film follows three low-lifes, played by the Suicide Kings, who rob a cannabis club after their house is burned down, not realizing that the club is owned by local crime lord Tyrone Shanks, played by slam poet Abdul Kenyatta. Like most of the cast, Kenyatta was drawn from the spoken word community. DeWolf spent the next two years filming with amateur actors on location around Oakland, including shootouts staged in broad daylight with blanks. He has said the film grew out of an article about a real cannabis club robbery, and that he was drawn to crime capers, heist films, and the "gray illegality" of cannabis clubs.

The Georgia Straight called Smoked "mean, bloody, and demented", but also very funny and extremely energetic, while noting its nihilism and its exaggeration of the dark side of the marijuana industry to cartoonish levels. The film was picked up for distribution by Indican Studios, and was a featured film at the Rio Grind Theater Film Festival in Vancouver and the Oakland Underground Film Festival. DeWolf has described Smoked as an exploration of his city's culture, with references to the Black Panthers and revolution and to the long-running tension between Oakland and Berkeley, "aggression versus pacifism".

== Films ==
A year into the filming of Smoked, DeWolf enrolled at San Francisco State University, where he received a film degree.

DeWolf has collaborated with Youth Speaks, a San Francisco-based organization for teen spoken-word artists, and has directed several films for its "The Bigger Picture Project", a joint effort with the UCSF Center for Vulnerable Populations to raise awareness of type 2 diabetes. Featured poets visit Bay Area high schools to perform their poetry and coach students to write their own health justice poetry. The campaign's films were covered by GOOD magazine.

His short film Thin Line, about a family stricken with diabetes and amputations, won the $5,000 Grand Prize in the Real Food Media Film Competition, and Home Flavored (also known as A Taste of Home) won the Grand Prize the following year. Thin Line and another Youth Speaks collaboration, The Dealer, were accepted into the 2013 Food and Farm Film Festival at the Roxie Theater. His film Perfect Soldiers won the youth category of the 2015 Sacramento Food Film Festival. In 2015 he was commissioned to direct Biker with a Moral Compass: Dr. Dick Fine and the Evolving Culture of SFGH, a documentary about Dick Fine, a UCSF and San Francisco General Hospital physician who founded the hospital's General Medicine Clinic.

DeWolf also made three films for the Off/Page Project, a collaboration between Youth Speaks and the Center for Investigative Reporting (CIR) that gives young people a multimedia platform to investigate issues and stories. In the inaugural video, Whispers from the Fields, 19-year-old Monica Mendoza takes on sexual violence among migrant women farmworkers. This Is Home was produced as part of Subsidized Squalor, a collaborative investigation by CIR, KQED and the San Francisco Chronicle into failures at the Richmond Housing Authority in California. The third film, Locked In, depicts the experience of young people in solitary confinement. DeWolf also made three films with Write Home on teen homelessness.

Several of the films were featured on Upworthy. His short film Waiting, made with performance poet and humorist Thadra Sheridan, went viral after appearing on Upworthy, reportedly receiving over a million views; the blog The Bitchy Waiter called it the best video about waiting tables. Ricochet in Reverse, starring Isaac Miller and Rafael Casal, retells the Columbine shootings in reverse as a meditation on youth violence and survival through art.

His noir short A Girl and a Gun won Best Acting Performance at the Briefs Erotic Film Festival and Best Writing at the Rio Grind Film Festival, in a competition judged by the Soska Sisters, directors of American Mary. Hey Baby Hey, about catcalling and sexual harassment, won four awards at the 2015 Briefs festival: the Grand Prize Audience Award, the Judges Award, Best Acting Performance, and Cinematography. Black Out, made with Wonder Dave and dealing with kink, sex and race, was accepted into the 2016 Briefs festival.

His horror-themed shorts have also screened at festivals. OK Monster, about a dating service for monsters, won the Grand Prize Audience award at the Scream Horror Film Festival and was selected for the Fantastic Planet Festival in Australia. Double Agent, which reworks a James Bond title sequence around sexual identity, was selected for the CineKink Film Festival in New York City. U Turn was selected for a feature-length horror anthology franchise by Ruthless Pictures and received international distribution.

DeWolf also directed the music video "Sweet Sh*t of Christ" for Bobby Joe Ebola and the Children MacNuggits, which compresses centuries of Christian history into a few minutes.

== Views on Scientology ==
DeWolf is an outspoken critic of the Church of Scientology. He has called Hubbard "one of the greatest con men of the last century". Speaking to the East Bay Express, he described Scientology as "the most brilliantly engineered pyramid scam I've ever seen" and Hubbard as "very intelligent, very sort of evil, malicious".

In 2001 DeWolf told the San Francisco Chronicle that Scientology agents had visited his mother and his girlfriend, asking about his comments on Scientology in his poetry and his appearance at a November 2000 benefit for the Lisa McPherson Trust in Clearwater, Florida. The poetry piece was titled "Judas' Son". The agents initially told his mother they were fellow poets, but DeWolf later said that she recognized them as Scientologists from the moment they started talking, and that they admitted it. DeWolf was quoted as saying, "They can't shut me up."

In a January 25, 2013, interview with Cenk Uygur on Current TV's The Young Turks, DeWolf called Scientology one of the most "devious, systematic brainwashing systems that's ever been invented". He described its teachings as a "hodgepodge of ideas" held together by a brutal security mindset and a "CIA-like structure" that members find intoxicating. He added that the former members he has met are intelligent people who were "completely destroyed".

In 2015, DeWolf staged a special edition of his monthly show as a game show aimed at Scientology, featuring a conversation with journalist Tony Ortega, who appeared in HBO's documentary Going Clear: Scientology and the Prison of Belief, and Paulette Cooper, author of The Scandal of Scientology.
