= Marc Bonilla =

American guitarist

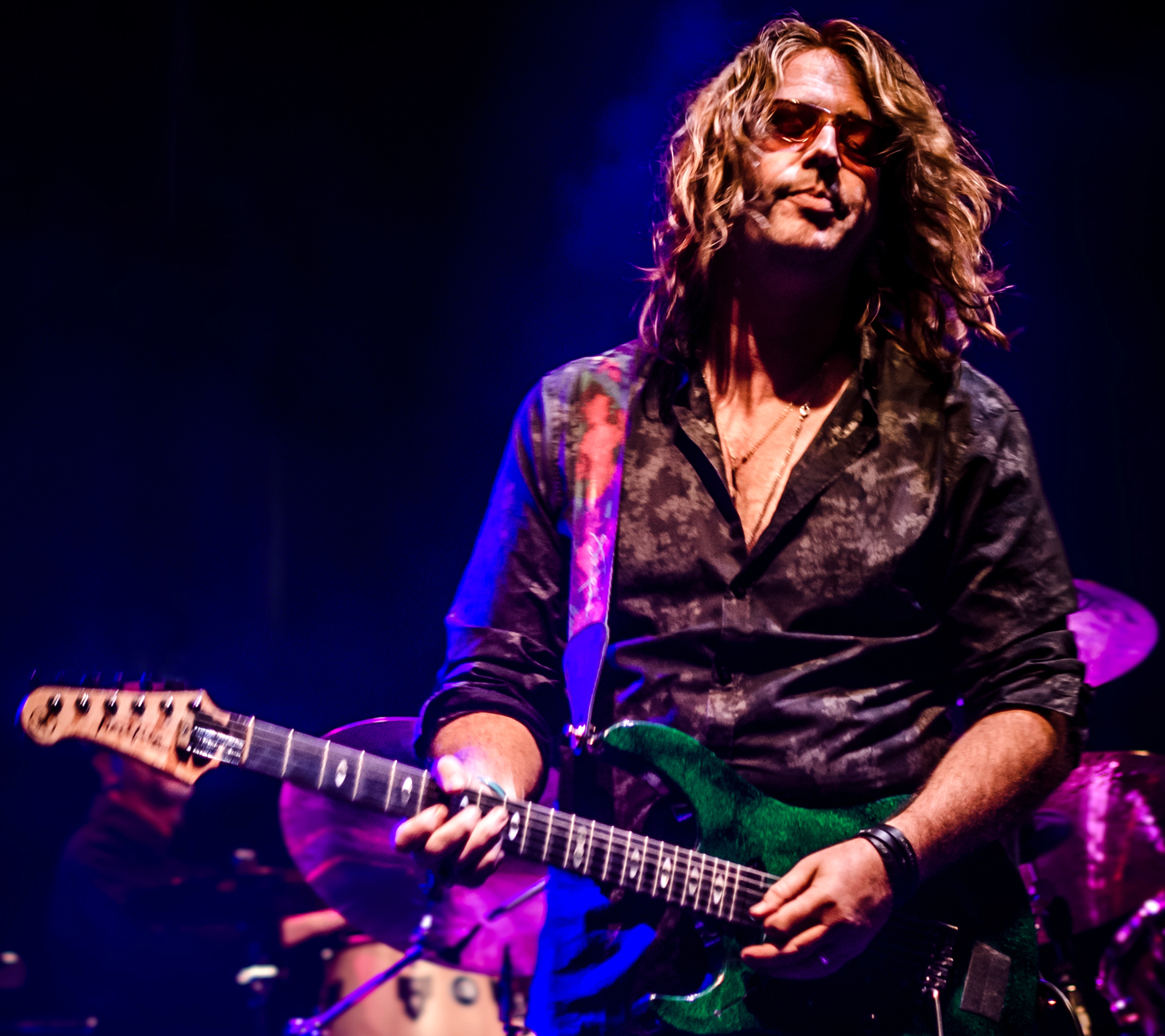

Background information
- Born: Marc Henry Bonilla; July 3, 1955 (age 71); Contra Costa County, California, U.S.
- Genres: Hard rock; heavy metal; soundtracks; blues rock; progressive rock; instrumental rock
- Occupations: Musician; songwriter
- Instruments: Guitar, vocals

Marc Henry Bonilla (born July 3, 1955) is an American guitarist and vocalist who has worked as a sideman to artists such as Keith Emerson, Ronnie Montrose, Glenn Hughes, Edgar Winter, David Coverdale, Asia, and Young MC.

== Career ==
=== Early years and film work ===
Bonilla is originally from the San Francisco Bay Area and, along with Joe Satriani, was one of the preeminent rock guitar teachers in the Bay area during the 1980s. Bonilla moved to LA in the early 1990s to work on TV and movie scoring working with James Newton Howard, John Debney, and others, eventually earning an Emmy nomination in 2001. He also lectured at LA's Guitar Institute of Technology (GIT).

In addition, he had cameo roles in the 1997 television series Night Man about a crime-fighting sax player, for which he was the musical director and acted as a performer (with his band) in several episodes under the alias Marc Bonilla and Dragonchoir.

He has done guitars for numerous films such as The Replacements, The Scorpion King, Spider-Man 2, Iron Man 2, Green Lantern, The Bourne Legacy, and composed and performed the music on the hit series, Justified, on FX channel, with keyboardist Steve Porcaro (Toto). He also composed for Comedy Central's The Nightly Show with Larry Wilmore.

=== With Keith Emerson ===
Marc played in Keith Emerson's 1995 album Changing States. In 1999, he appeared on the Emerson, Lake & Palmer tribute album Encores, Legends & Paradox released by Magna Carta Records. He then joined the Keith Emerson band in 2006 and played with him until Emerson's passing in 2016.

In 2012, Marc completed an album with Keith Emerson titled The Three Fates Project with the Munich Radio Orchestra, conducted by Terje Mikkelsen. In 2018, he collaborated on a tribute album containing Emerson compositions called Beyond The Stars – Keith Emerson with the Academy of St Martin in the Fields, featuring Rachel Flowers and Keith's grandson Ethan Emerson.

=== Other sideman work ===
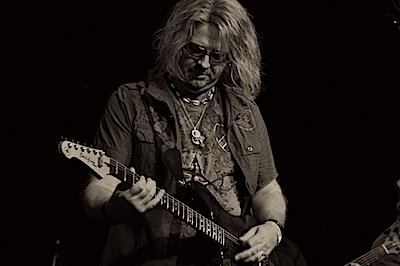
Bonilla live in concert with California Transit Authority

Although Bonilla appears in the video for Toy Matinee's "The Ballad of Jenny Ledge," he did not actually play guitar on the album. Guitar work for the Toy Matinee LP was done by LA studio guitarist Tim Pierce, though Bonilla replaced him for the touring incarnation of the band along with Sheryl Crow, Spencer Campbell, and Toss Panos. Also in the band, as a de facto bandleader, was the late Kevin Gilbert. Marc worked extensively with Gilbert at the beginning of the 1990s, notably on his debut solo album EE Ticket which Gilbert produced. Before fully forming the Toy Matinee live band, in 1990 Gilbert and Bonilla appeared on different radio stations to promote the project, which is when they established a relationship with KLOS' Mark Thompson and Brian Phelps of The Mark & Brian Show. In December of that year, Gilbert and Bonilla performed at Mark and Brian's annual Christmas Show.

He has also worked with Glenn Hughes on two albums: 1996's Addiction (produced, co-written and performed) and 1999's The Way It Is (also playing keyboards).

In late 2000, he played in David Coverdale's live band.

Bonilla currently plays in California Transit Authority, a project led by former Chicago drummer, founding member and Rock n' Roll Hall of Famer Danny Seraphine, featuring some updates to early Chicago songs as well as new material and has currently completed the follow-up album of all original material.

In April 2017, Bonilla and Eddie Jobson began the "Fallen Angels Tour," a tribute to the music of John Wetton & Keith Emerson. In addition, he tours with Eddie Jobson's UZ Project as singer, guitarist and bassist.

He has also toured with Harry Shearer (a.k.a. Derek Smalls from Spinal Tap) playing guitar, bass and mandolin, in his "Smalls Change Tour".

In 2022, Asia announced a 40th Anniversary Tour, with Bonilla on guitar and lead vocals. However, the tour was cancelled before any activity could take place.

=== Solo work ===
Marc Bonilla has released three solo albums. EE Ticket came out in 1991 on Reprise Records. American Matador followed in 1993 on Warner Records, including covers of "A Whiter Shade of Pale" and "I Am the Walrus" with guest Ronnie Montrose.

Around the time that EE Ticket was released, Yamaha musical instruments produced a prototype left-handed Marc Bonilla model guitar. This guitar was embellished with comic book superheroes, of which Bonilla was very fond.

His third solo release was a guitar instrumental album called Celluloid Debris, released in 2019 and available exclusively through his own website.

=== Graphic design ===
Aside from his work as a musician, Bonilla was also a graphic artist, who did album cover designs for Ronnie Montrose, with his 1986 solo album Territory and with his band Montrose, the 1987 album Mean.

== Discography ==
=== Solo ===
- 1991: EE Ticket
- 1993: American Matador
- 2019: Celluloid Debris

=== Glenn Hughes ===
- 1996: Addiction
- 1999: The Way It Is

=== Bobby Gaylor ===
- 2000: Fuzzatonic Scream

=== Kevin Gilbert ===
- 2010: Kevin Gilbert Performs Toy Matinee Live (live May 1, 1991)
- 2014: Toy Matinee Acoustic (live Nov. 1990 – Apr. 1991)
- 2021: Covers (tracks 3–5, recorded 1990–91)
- 2024: Troy Manitee: Men Without Pat – Live At Ventura Theater 1991

=== Keith Emerson ===
- 2008: Keith Emerson Band Featuring Marc Bonilla
- 2010: Moscow (live August 26, 2008)
- 2012: Three Fates Project (with Terje Mikkelsen, Munich Radio Orchestra)

=== Keith Emerson – Glenn Hughes – Marc Bonilla ===
- 2009: Boys Club Live From California (recorded 1998)

=== CTA – Danny Seraphine and the California Transit Authority ===
- 2006: Full Circle
- 2013: Sacred Ground

=== Saville Row ===
2014: The Way Around It (with Troy Luccketta, Mika Greiner, Travis Davis)

=== Ronnie Montrose ===
- 2017: 10x10 – Track "Head On Straight"

=== Soundtracks ===
- 1992: Diggstown (soundtrack)
- 1994: Terminal Velocity (soundtrack)
- 1997: Night Man (soundtrack)
- 2000: The Replacements (soundtrack)
- 2002: The Scorpion King (soundtrack)
- 2012: The Bourne Legacy (soundtrack)

=== The Wring ===
- 2021: The Wring2 – Project Cypher

=== Guest ===
- 1999: Encores, Legends and Paradox (ELP tribute album)
