= List of Billboard Hot 100 top-ten singles in 1983 =

This is a list of singles that have peaked in the Top 10 of the Billboard Hot 100 during 1983.

A total of 96 singles hit the top-ten in 1983, an increase from 81 top-tens in the previous year. 16 singles reached number-one, while 8 songs reached a peak of number-two.

Michael Jackson scored seven top ten hits during the year with "The Girl Is Mine", "Billie Jean", "Beat It", "Wanna Be Startin' Somethin'", "Human Nature", "Say Say Say", and "P.Y.T. (Pretty Young Thing)", the most among all other artists.

== Top-ten singles ==
- (#) – 1983 Year-end top 10 single position and rank

List of Billboard Hot 100 top ten singles which peaked in 1983
Top ten entry date	Single	Artist(s)	Peak	Peak date	Weeks in top ten
Singles from 1982
November 27	"The Girl Is Mine"	Michael Jackson and Paul McCartney	2	January 8	10
December 4	"Dirty Laundry"	Don Henley	3	January 8	10
December 11	"Sexual Healing"	Marvin Gaye	3	January 29	10
December 25	"Down Under" (#4)	Men at Work	1	January 15	10
Singles from 1983
January 15	"Africa"	Toto	1	February 5	6
January 15	"Baby, Come to Me" (#8)	Patti Austin and James Ingram	1	February 19	9
January 15	"Rock the Casbah"	The Clash	8	January 22	5
January 15	"Heartbreaker"	Dionne Warwick	10	January 15	2
January 29	"Shame on the Moon"	Bob Seger & The Silver Bullet Band	2	February 26	8
January 29	"You and I"	Eddie Rabbitt and Crystal Gayle	7	February 12	6
February 5	"You Can't Hurry Love"	Phil Collins	10	February 5	3
February 12	"Stray Cat Strut"	Stray Cats	3	February 26	5
February 19	"Billie Jean" (#2)	Michael Jackson	1	March 5	11
February 19	"Do You Really Want to Hurt Me"	Culture Club	2	March 26	9
February 19	"Hungry Like the Wolf"	Duran Duran	3	March 26	9
February 26	"We've Got Tonight"	Kenny Rogers and Sheena Easton	6	March 26	7
February 26	"Pass the Dutchie"	Musical Youth	10	February 26	2
March 5	"Back on the Chain Gang"	The Pretenders	5	March 19	5
March 12	"You Are"	Lionel Richie	4	March 26	4
March 12	"Separate Ways (Worlds Apart)"	Journey	8	March 19	7
March 19	"One on One"	Hall & Oates	7	April 9	6
March 19	"Mr. Roboto"	Styx	3	April 16	8
March 26	"Twilight Zone"	Golden Earring	10	March 26	2
April 9	"Come On Eileen"	Dexys Midnight Runners	1	April 23	6
April 9	"Jeopardy"	The Greg Kihn Band	2	May 7	7
April 9	"Beat It" (#5)	Michael Jackson	1	April 30	10
April 16	"Der Kommissar"	After the Fire	5	April 30	5
April 23	"Let's Dance"	David Bowie	1	May 21	10
April 23	"She Blinded Me with Science"	Thomas Dolby	5	May 14	8
April 30	"Overkill"	Men at Work	3	June 4	8
April 30	"Little Red Corvette"	Prince	6	May 21	6
May 7	"I Won't Hold You Back"	Toto	10	May 7	1
May 14	"Flashdance... What a Feeling" (#3)	Irene Cara	1	May 28	14
May 14	"Solitaire"	Laura Branigan	7	May 21	4
May 21	"My Love"	Lionel Richie	5	June 11	5
May 21	"Time (Clock of the Heart)"	Culture Club	2	June 18	9
May 28	"Straight from the Heart"	Bryan Adams	10	May 28	2
June 11	"Always Something There to Remind Me"	Naked Eyes	8	June 11	2
June 11	"Don't Let It End"	Styx	6	July 2	5
June 11	"Affair of the Heart"	Rick Springfield	9	June 18	3
June 18	"Electric Avenue"	Eddy Grant	2	July 2	8
June 18	"Family Man"	Hall & Oates	6	June 25	3
June 25	"Every Breath You Take" (#1)	The Police	1	July 9	13
June 25	"Never Gonna Let You Go"	Sérgio Mendes	4	July 9	8
June 25	"Too Shy"	Kajagoogoo	5	July 9	4
July 2	"Wanna Be Startin' Somethin'"	Michael Jackson	5	July 16	6
July 2	"She's a Beauty"	The Tubes	10	July 2	1
July 9	"Come Dancing"	The Kinks	6	July 16	3
July 9	"Our House"	Madness	7	July 23	4
July 16	"Is There Something I Should Know?"	Duran Duran	4	August 6	6
July 23	"Stand Back"	Stevie Nicks	5	August 20	6
July 23	"She Works Hard for the Money"	Donna Summer	3	August 6	8
July 30	"Sweet Dreams (Are Made of This)" (#10)	Eurythmics	1	September 3	9
August 6	"Maniac" (#9)	Michael Sembello	1	September 10	9
August 13	"It's a Mistake"	Men at Work	6	August 20	4
August 13	"(Keep Feeling) Fascination"	The Human League	8	August 20	3
August 20	"Puttin' on the Ritz"	Taco	4	September 3	6
August 20	"I'll Tumble 4 Ya"	Culture Club	9	August 27	4
August 27	"China Girl"	David Bowie	10	August 27	1
September 3	"The Safety Dance"	Men Without Hats	3	September 10	7
September 3	"Tell Her About It"	Billy Joel	1	September 24	7
September 3	"Human Nature"	Michael Jackson	7	September 17	4
September 10	"Total Eclipse of the Heart" (#6)	Bonnie Tyler	1	October 1	11
September 17	"Making Love Out of Nothing at All"	Air Supply	2	October 8	9
September 17	"Don't Cry"	Asia	10	September 17	2
September 24	"(She's) Sexy + 17"	Stray Cats	5	October 1	4
October 1	"King of Pain"	The Police	3	October 8	5
October 1	"True"	Spandau Ballet	4	October 8	6
October 1	"Islands in the Stream"	Kenny Rogers and Dolly Parton	1	October 29	12
October 1	"Far from Over"	Frank Stallone	10	October 1	2
October 8	"One Thing Leads to Another"	The Fixx	4	November 5	7
October 15	"All Night Long (All Night)"	Lionel Richie	1	November 12	13
October 22	"Delirious"	Prince	8	October 22	4
October 22	"Burning Down the House"	Talking Heads	9	October 22	1
October 22	"Telefone (Long Distance Love Affair)"	Sheena Easton	9	October 29	3
October 29	"Uptown Girl"	Billy Joel	3	November 12	10
November 5	"Say Say Say"	Paul McCartney and Michael Jackson	1	December 10	13
November 12	"Cum on Feel the Noize"	Quiet Riot	5	November 19	5
November 12	"Suddenly Last Summer"	The Motels	9	November 19	2
November 19	"Love Is a Battlefield"	Pat Benatar	5	December 10	7
November 19	"Say It Isn't So"	Hall & Oates	2	December 17	10
November 26	"Heart and Soul"	Huey Lewis and the News	8	November 26	2
November 26	"Crumblin' Down"	John Cougar Mellencamp	9	November 26	3
November 26	"P.Y.T. (Pretty Young Thing)"	Michael Jackson	10	November 26	1
December 3	"Church of the Poison Mind"	Culture Club	10	December 3	3
December 10	"Union of the Snake"	Duran Duran	3	December 24	6
December 24	"Undercover of the Night"	The Rolling Stones	9	December 24	3

=== 1982 peaks ===
List of Billboard Hot 100 top ten singles in 1983 which peaked in 1982
Top ten entry date	Single	Artist(s)	Peak	Peak date	Weeks in top ten
November 6	"Truly"	Lionel Richie	1	November 27	10
November 6	"Gloria"	Laura Branigan	2	November 27	10
November 20	"Maneater" (#7)	Hall & Oates	1	December 18	13
November 20	"Mickey"	Toni Basil	1	December 11	10
November 20	"Steppin' Out"	Joe Jackson	6	December 11	8
December 11	"Rock This Town"	Stray Cats	9	December 11	5

=== 1984 peaks ===
List of Billboard Hot 100 top ten singles in 1983 which peaked in 1984
Top ten entry date	Single	Artist(s)	Peak	Peak date	Weeks in top ten
December 17	"Owner of a Lonely Heart"	Yes	1	January 21	10
December 17	"Twist of Fate"	Olivia Newton-John	5	January 7	7
December 24	"Break My Stride"	Matthew Wilder	5	January 21	7

== See also ==
- 1983 in music
- List of Billboard Hot 100 number ones of 1983
- Billboard Year-End Hot 100 singles of 1983
