= Billboard Year-End Hot Black Singles of 1983 =

American music chart

This is a list of Billboard magazine's Top Hot Black Singles of 1983.

No.	Title	Artist(s)
1	"Sexual Healing"	Marvin Gaye
2	"Billie Jean"	Michael Jackson
3	"Juicy Fruit"	Mtume
4	"Cold Blooded"	Rick James
5	"Atomic Dog"	George Clinton
6	"The Girl Is Mine"	Michael Jackson and Paul McCartney
7	"She Works Hard for the Money"	Donna Summer
8	"Save the Overtime (For Me)"	Gladys Knight & the Pips
9	"Outstanding"	The Gap Band
10	"I Like It"	DeBarge
11	"Baby, Come to Me"	Patti Austin and James Ingram
12	"Try Again"	Champaign
13	"You Are"	Lionel Richie
14	"Beat It"	Michael Jackson
15	"Flashdance... What a Feeling"	Irene Cara
16	"Betcha She Don't Love You"	Evelyn King
17	"Just Be Good to Me"	The S.O.S. Band
18	"Between the Sheets"	The Isley Brothers
19	"Got to Be There"	Chaka Khan
20	"Get It Right"	Aretha Franklin
21	"Bad Boy"	Ray Parker Jr.
22	"Freak-A-Zoid"	Atlantic Starr
23	"Electric Avenue"	Eddy Grant
24	"Truly"	Lionel Richie
25	"How Do You Keep the Music Playing?"	James Ingram and Patti Austin
26	"Knockout"	Margie Joseph
27	"Candy Girl"	New Edition
28	"Don't You Get So Mad"	Jeffrey Osborne
29	"Are You Serious"	Tyrone Davis
30	"Tonight, I Celebrate My Love"	Peabo Bryson and Roberta Flack
31	"Love is the Key"	Maze
32	"Put It in a Magazine"	Sonny Charles
33	"All This Love"	DeBarge
34	"Fall in Love with Me"	Earth, Wind & Fire
35	"Too Tough"	Angela Bofill
36	"I Just Gotta Have You (Lover Turn Me On)"	Kashif
37	"Inside Love (So Personal)"	George Benson
38	"Rockit"	Herbie Hancock
39	"Do What You Feel"	Deniece Williams
40	"Tonight I Give In"	Angela Bofill
41	"Do It (Let Me See You Shake)"	Bar-Kays
42	"Bottom's Up"	The Chi-Lites
43	"It's Like That" / "Sucker M.C.'s"	Run-DMC
44	"Keep On Lovin' Me"	The Whispers
45	"Pass the Dutchie"	Musical Youth
46	"The Best Is Yet to Come"	Grover Washington Jr. featuring Patti LaBelle
47	"Let's Go Dancin' (Ooh La La La)"	Kool & the Gang
48	"Ain't Nobody"	Rufus and Chaka Khan
49	"I'm Freaky"	O'Bryan
50	"I've Made Love to You a Thousand Times"	Smokey Robinson

== See also ==
- 1983 in music
- Billboard Year-End Hot 100 singles of 1983
- List of Black Singles number ones of 1983
