= Billboard Year-End Hot 100 singles of 1983 =

Ranking of recorded music

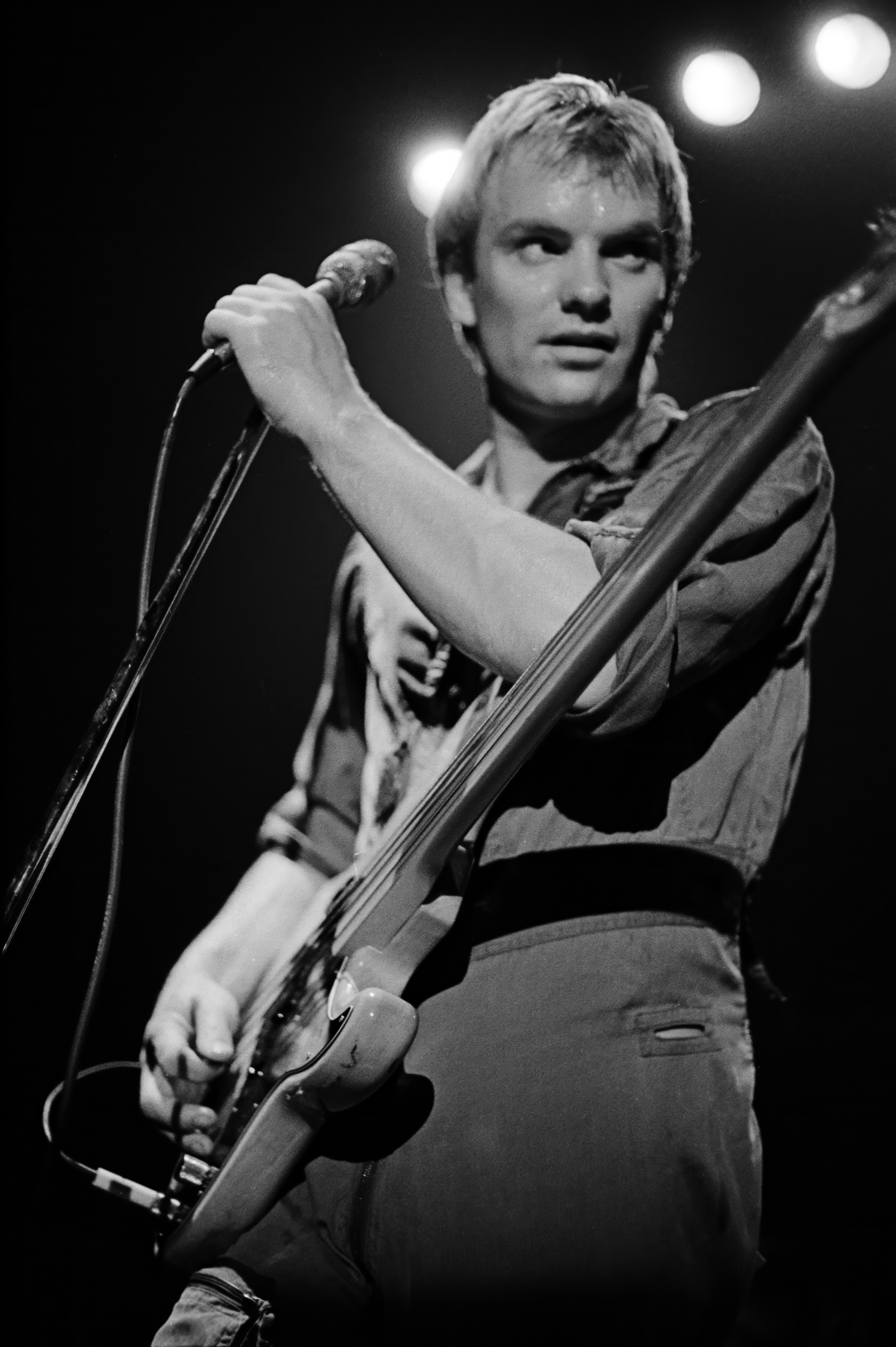
"Every Breath You Take" by The Police (singer Sting pictured) was the number one song of 1983.

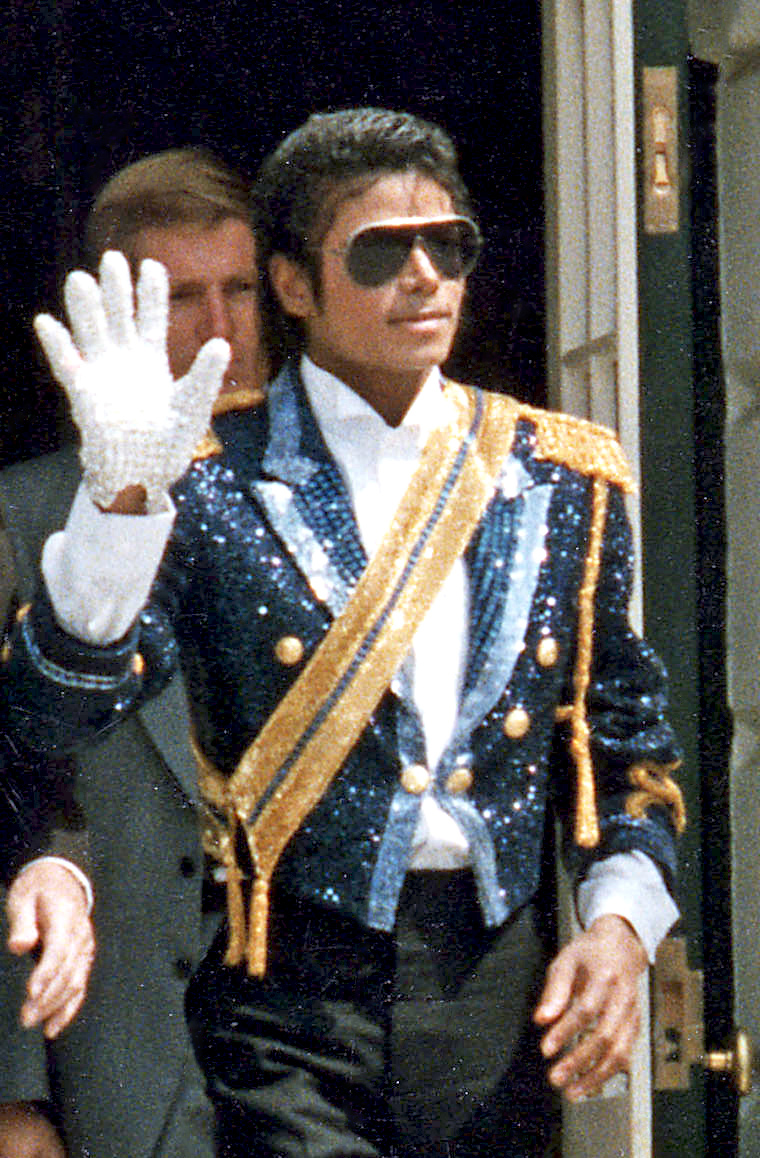
Michael Jackson (pictured) had five songs on the Year-End Hot 100, the most of any artist in 1983.

This is a list of Billboard magazine's Top Hot 100 songs of 1983.

No.	Title	Artist(s)
1	"Every Breath You Take"	The Police
2	"Billie Jean"	Michael Jackson
3	"Flashdance... What a Feeling"	Irene Cara
4	"Down Under"	Men at Work
5	"Beat It"	Michael Jackson
6	"Total Eclipse of the Heart"	Bonnie Tyler
7	"Maneater"	Daryl Hall & John Oates
8	"Baby, Come to Me"	Patti Austin and James Ingram
9	"Maniac"	Michael Sembello
10	"Sweet Dreams (Are Made of This)"	Eurythmics
11	"Do You Really Want to Hurt Me"	Culture Club
12	"You and I"	Eddie Rabbitt and Crystal Gayle
13	"Come On Eileen"	Dexys Midnight Runners
14	"Shame on the Moon"	Bob Seger & The Silver Bullet Band
15	"She Works Hard for the Money"	Donna Summer
16	"Never Gonna Let You Go"	Sérgio Mendes
17	"Hungry Like the Wolf"	Duran Duran
18	"Let's Dance"	David Bowie
19	"Twilight Zone"	Golden Earring
20	"I Know There's Something Going On"	Frida
21	"Jeopardy"	The Greg Kihn Band
22	"Electric Avenue"	Eddy Grant
23	"She Blinded Me with Science"	Thomas Dolby
24	"Africa"	Toto
25	"Little Red Corvette"	Prince
26	"Back on the Chain Gang"	The Pretenders
27	"Up Where We Belong"	Joe Cocker and Jennifer Warnes
28	"Mr. Roboto"	Styx
29	"You Are"	Lionel Richie
30	"Der Kommissar"	After the Fire
31	"Puttin' on the Ritz"	Taco
32	"Sexual Healing"	Marvin Gaye
33	"(Keep Feeling) Fascination"	The Human League
34	"Time (Clock of the Heart)"	Culture Club
35	"The Safety Dance"	Men Without Hats
36	"Mickey"	Toni Basil
37	"You Can't Hurry Love"	Phil Collins
38	"Separate Ways (Worlds Apart)"	Journey
39	"One on One"	Daryl Hall & John Oates
40	"We've Got Tonight"	Kenny Rogers and Sheena Easton
41	"1999"	Prince
42	"Stray Cat Strut"	Stray Cats
43	"Allentown"	Billy Joel
44	"Stand Back"	Stevie Nicks
45	"Tell Her About It"	Billy Joel
46	"Always Something There to Remind Me"	Naked Eyes
47	"Truly"	Lionel Richie
48	"Dirty Laundry"	Don Henley
49	"The Girl Is Mine"	Michael Jackson and Paul McCartney
50	"Too Shy"	Kajagoogoo
51	"Goody Two-Shoes"	Adam Ant
52	"Rock the Casbah"	The Clash
53	"Our House"	Madness
54	"Overkill"	Men at Work
55	"Is There Something I Should Know?"	Duran Duran
56	"Gloria"	Laura Branigan
57	"Affair of the Heart"	Rick Springfield
58	"She's a Beauty"	The Tubes
59	"Solitaire"	Laura Branigan
60	"Don't Let It End"	Styx
61	"How Am I Supposed to Live Without You"	Laura Branigan
62	"China Girl"	David Bowie
63	"Come Dancing"	The Kinks
64	"Promises, Promises"	Naked Eyes
65	"The Other Guy"	Little River Band
66	"Making Love Out of Nothing at All"	Air Supply
67	"Family Man"	Daryl Hall & John Oates
68	"Wanna Be Startin' Somethin'"	Michael Jackson
69	"I Won't Hold You Back"	Toto
70	"All Right"	Christopher Cross
71	"Straight from the Heart"	Bryan Adams
72	"Heart to Heart"	Kenny Loggins
73	"My Love"	Lionel Richie
74	"I'm Still Standing"	Elton John
75	"Hot Girls in Love"	Loverboy
76	"It's a Mistake"	Men at Work
77	"I'll Tumble 4 Ya"	Culture Club
78	"All This Love"	DeBarge
79	"Your Love Is Driving Me Crazy"	Sammy Hagar
80	"Heartbreaker"	Dionne Warwick
81	"Faithfully"	Journey
82	"Steppin' Out"	Joe Jackson
83	"Take Me to Heart"	Quarterflash
84	"(She's) Sexy + 17"	Stray Cats
85	"Try Again"	Champaign
86	"Dead Giveaway"	Shalamar
87	"Lawyers in Love"	Jackson Browne
88	"What About Me"	Moving Pictures
89	"Human Nature"	Michael Jackson
90	"Photograph"	Def Leppard
91	"Pass the Dutchie"	Musical Youth
92	"True"	Spandau Ballet
93	"Far from Over"	Frank Stallone
94	"I've Got a Rock 'n' Roll Heart"	Eric Clapton
95	"It Might Be You"	Stephen Bishop
96	"Tonight, I Celebrate My Love"	Peabo Bryson and Roberta Flack
97	"You Got Lucky"	Tom Petty and the Heartbreakers
98	"Don't Cry"	Asia
99	"Breaking Us in Two"	Joe Jackson
100	"Fall in Love with Me"	Earth, Wind & Fire

== See also ==
- 1983 in music
- Billboard Year-End Hot Black Singles of 1983
- List of Billboard Hot 100 number ones of 1983
- List of Billboard Hot 100 top-ten singles in 1983
