= List of Black Singles number ones of 1983 =

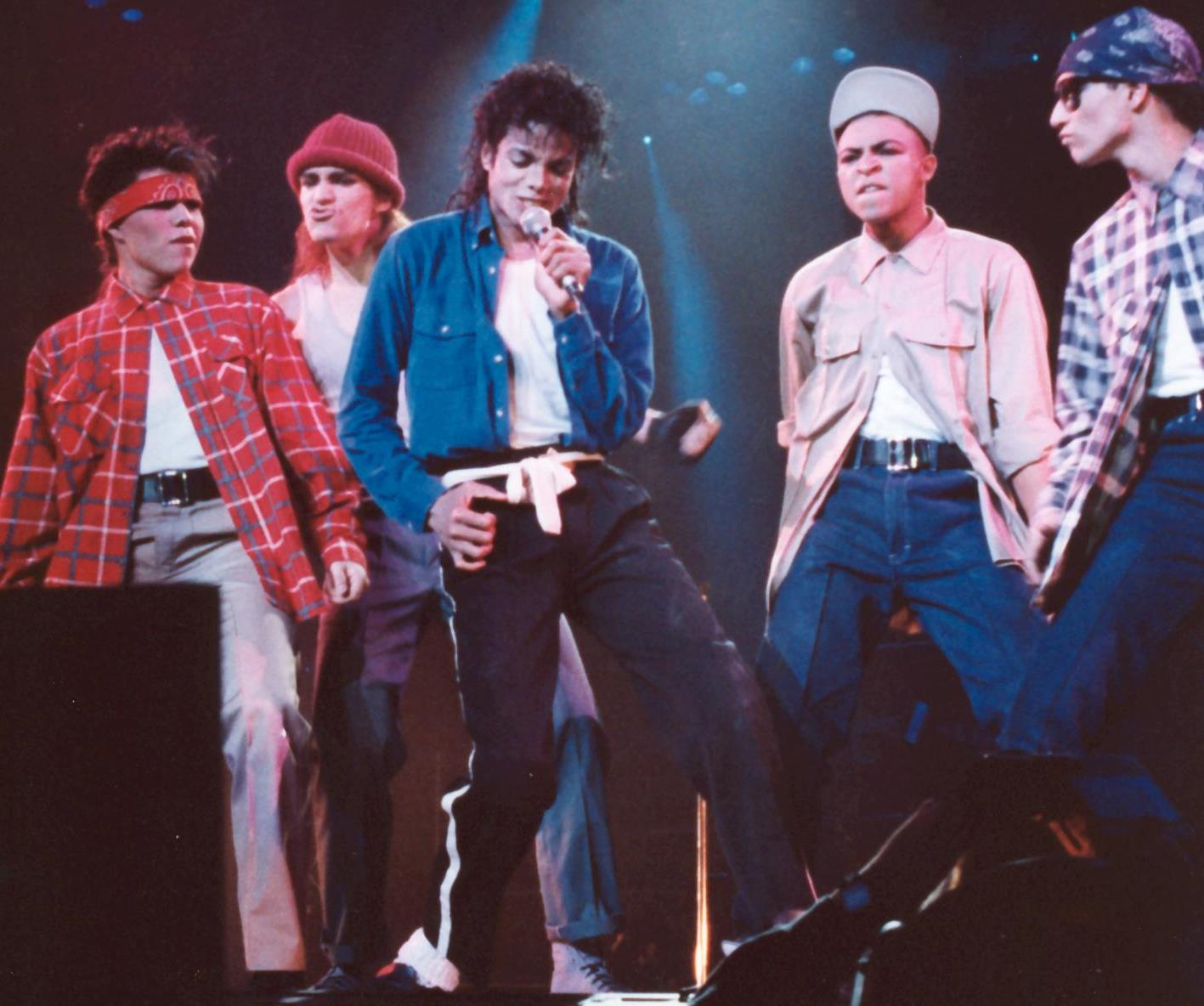
Michael Jackson (center, pictured in 1988) had three number ones in 1983.

Billboard published a weekly chart in 1983 ranking the top-performing singles in the United States in African American-oriented genres; the chart has undergone various name changes over the decades to reflect the evolution of black music and has been published as Hot R&B/Hip-Hop Songs since 2005. In 1983, it was published under the title Black Singles, and 13 different singles reached number one.

In the issue of Billboard dated January 1, "Sexual Healing" by Marvin Gaye was at number one, its ninth week in the top spot. It spent one further week atop the chart for a total of ten weeks at number one, the longest-running chart-topper on the listing since 1962. The track was replaced at number one in the issue dated January 15 by "The Girl Is Mine" by Michael Jackson and Paul McCartney. The duet was the first of three number ones for Jackson in the first half of the year, all taken from his album Thriller, regarded as the worldwide best-selling album of all time. "The Girl Is Mine" spent three weeks at number one and after one week out of the top spot, Jackson returned to number one in the issue dated February 12 with "Billie Jean". This track spent nine consecutive weeks at number one, the longest chart-topping run of 1983. Not until 1994, when "Bump n' Grind" by R. Kelly spent 12 weeks at number one, would another song spend as long atop the chart. "Billie Jean" has been included on various lists of the greatest songs of all time, including the Rock and Roll Hall of Fame's 500 Songs That Shaped Rock and Roll. Jackson spent one further week at number one in May with "Beat It"; he was the only act with more than one number one during the year and his total of 13 weeks in the top spot was the highest of any act.

Several acts topped the chart in 1983 for the first time, beginning with McCartney in January. In April, George Clinton achieved his first solo number one with "Atomic Dog"; he had previously experienced considerable success in the 1970s as the leader of the Parliament-Funkadelic collective. His track was replaced in the top spot by "Candy Girl", the debut single by teenaged vocal group New Edition. The group Mtume gained its first number one with "Juicy Fruit", which had the year's second-longest run in the top spot, spending eight weeks in the peak position. The song has gone on to be sampled by many acts and called "one of the most recognizable samples in hip-hop history". Finally, family vocal group DeBarge topped the chart for the first time in December with "Time Will Reveal", which was the final number one of 1983. "Billie Jean", "Beat It", and "All Night Long (All Night)" by Lionel Richie also topped Billboard's pop singles chart, the Hot 100.

== Chart history ==
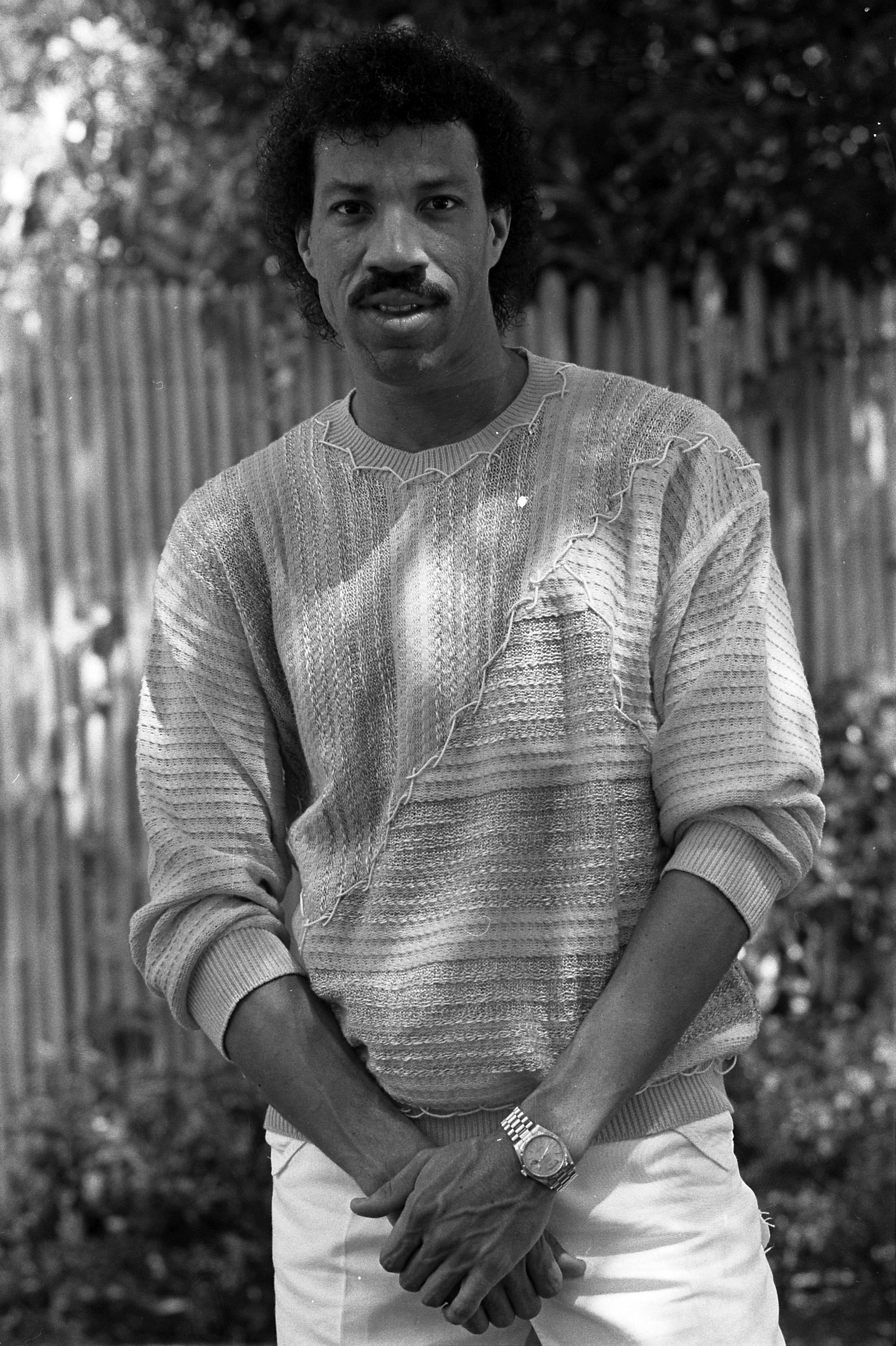
Lionel Richie (pictured in 1984) spent seven weeks at number one with "All Night Long (All Night)".

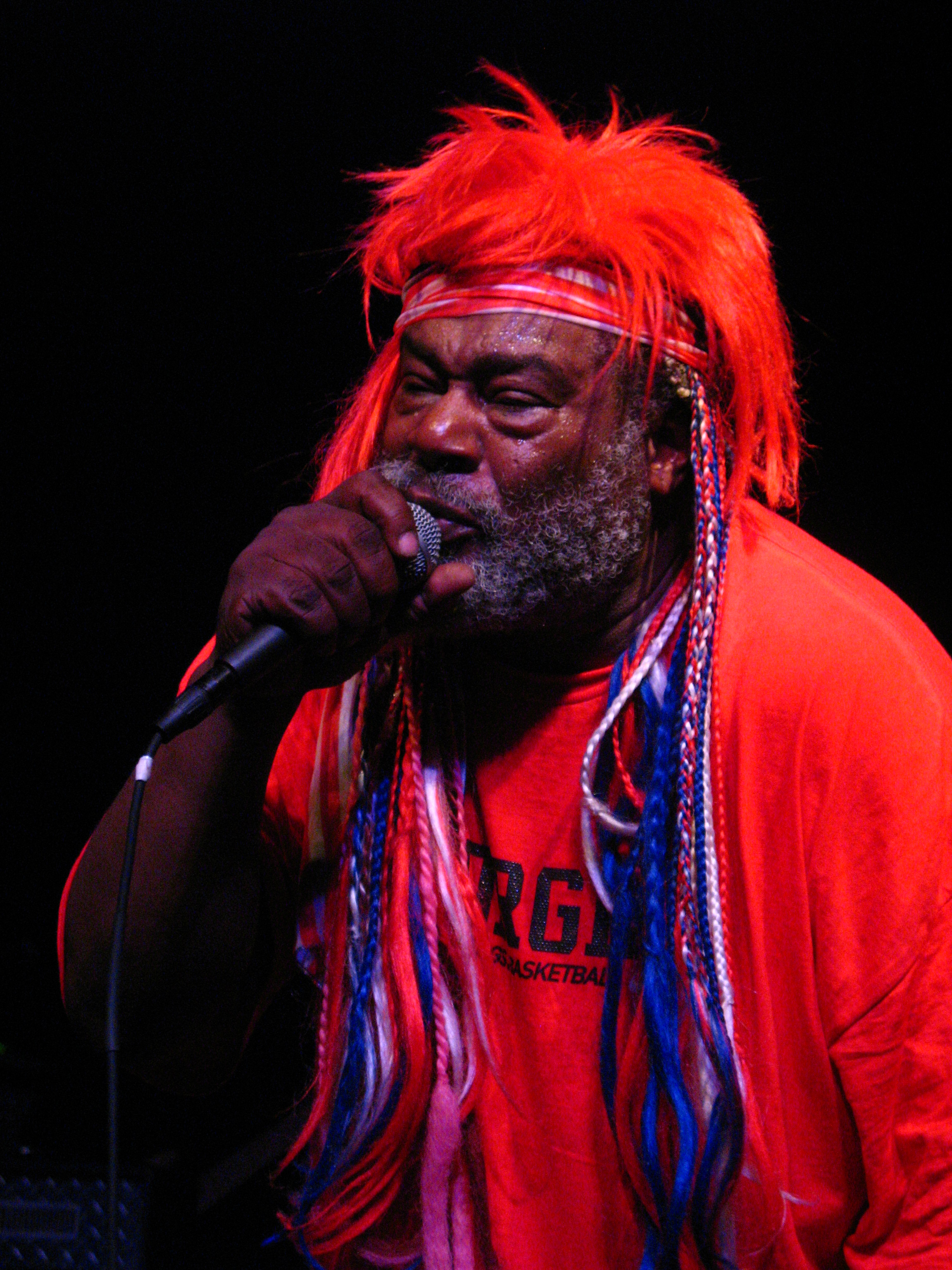
"Atomic Dog" was the first solo number one for George Clinton (pictured in 2007).

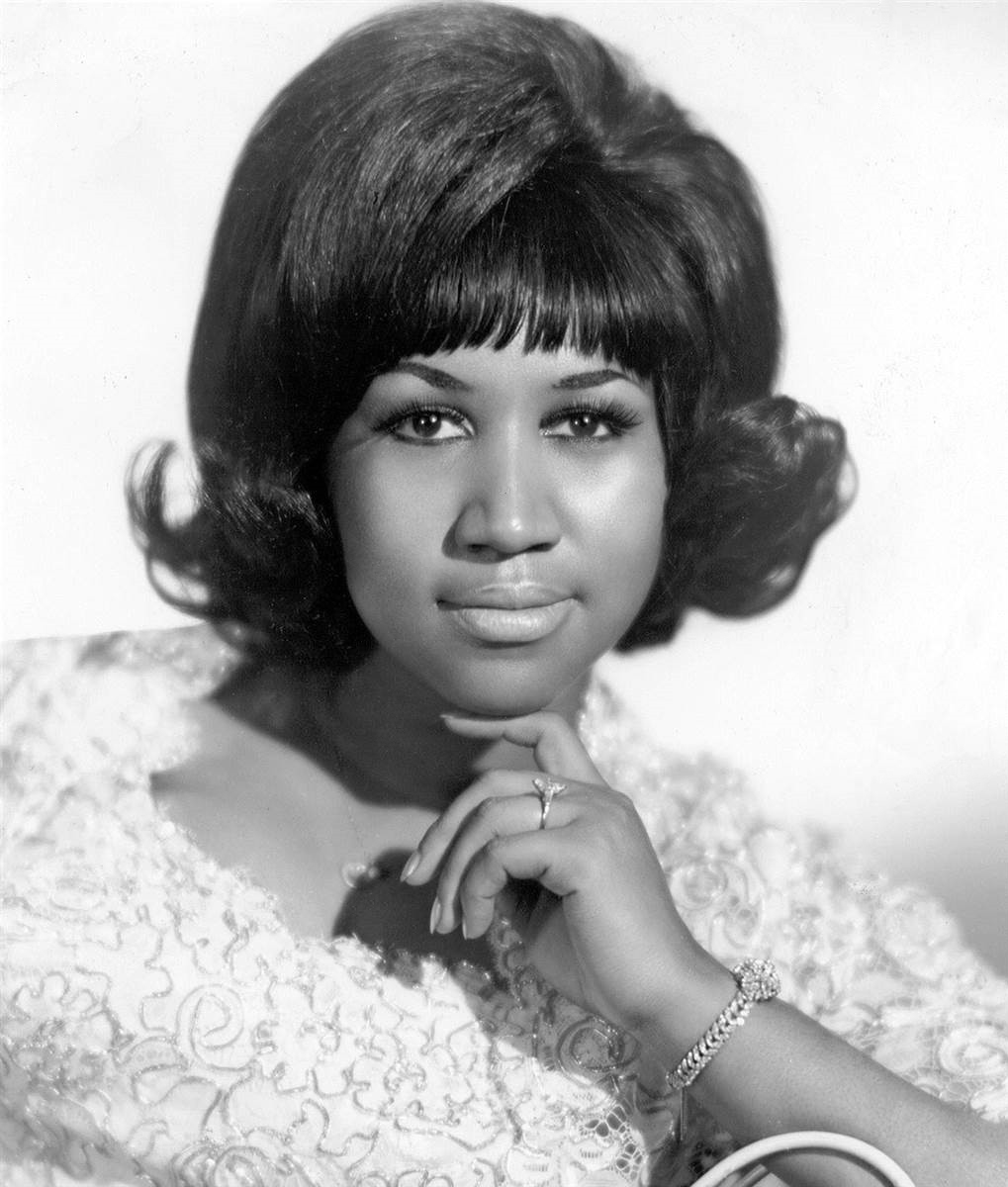
Aretha Franklin (pictured in 1968) topped the chart for the 19th time with "Get It Right".

Key
†	Indicates number 1 on Billboard's year-end black singles chart

Chart history
Issue date	Title	Artist(s)	Ref.
January 1	"Sexual Healing" †	Marvin Gaye	
January 8	"Sexual Healing" †	Marvin Gaye	
January 15	"The Girl Is Mine"	Michael Jackson & Paul McCartney	
January 22	"The Girl Is Mine"	Michael Jackson & Paul McCartney	
January 29	"The Girl Is Mine"	Michael Jackson & Paul McCartney	
February 5	"Outstanding"	The Gap Band	
February 12	"Billie Jean"	Michael Jackson	
February 19	"Billie Jean"	Michael Jackson	
February 26	"Billie Jean"	Michael Jackson	
March 5	"Billie Jean"	Michael Jackson	
March 12	"Billie Jean"	Michael Jackson	
March 19	"Billie Jean"	Michael Jackson	
March 26	"Billie Jean"	Michael Jackson	
April 2	"Billie Jean"	Michael Jackson	
April 9	"Billie Jean"	Michael Jackson	
April 16	"Atomic Dog"	George Clinton	
April 23	"Atomic Dog"	George Clinton	
April 30	"Atomic Dog"	George Clinton	
May 7	"Atomic Dog"	George Clinton	
May 14	"Candy Girl"	New Edition	
May 21	"Beat It"	Michael Jackson	
May 28	"Save the Overtime (For Me)"	Gladys Knight and the Pips	
June 4	"Juicy Fruit"	Mtume	
June 11	"Juicy Fruit"	Mtume	
June 18	"Juicy Fruit"	Mtume	
June 25	"Juicy Fruit"	Mtume	
July 2	"Juicy Fruit"	Mtume	
July 9	"Juicy Fruit"	Mtume	
July 16	"Juicy Fruit"	Mtume	
July 23	"Juicy Fruit"	Mtume	
July 30	"She Works Hard for the Money"	Donna Summer	
August 6	"She Works Hard for the Money"	Donna Summer	
August 13	"She Works Hard for the Money"	Donna Summer	
August 20	"Get It Right"	Aretha Franklin	
August 27	"Get It Right"	Aretha Franklin	
September 3	"Cold Blooded"	Rick James	
September 10	"Cold Blooded"	Rick James	
September 17	"Cold Blooded"	Rick James	
September 24	"Cold Blooded"	Rick James	
October 1	"Cold Blooded"	Rick James	
October 8	"Cold Blooded"	Rick James	
October 15	"Ain't Nobody"	Rufus & Chaka Khan	
October 22	"All Night Long (All Night)"	Lionel Richie	
October 29	"All Night Long (All Night)"	Lionel Richie	
November 5	"All Night Long (All Night)"	Lionel Richie	
November 12	"All Night Long (All Night)"	Lionel Richie	
November 19	"All Night Long (All Night)"	Lionel Richie	
November 26	"All Night Long (All Night)"	Lionel Richie	
December 3	"All Night Long (All Night)"	Lionel Richie	
December 10	"Time Will Reveal"	DeBarge	
December 17	"Time Will Reveal"	DeBarge	
December 24	"Time Will Reveal"	DeBarge	
December 31	"Time Will Reveal"	DeBarge	

== See also ==
- 1983 in music
- Billboard Year-End Hot Black Singles of 1983
- List of Billboard Hot 100 number ones of 1983
