= Steven Houghton =

British actor and singer

Steven Houghton (born 16 February 1971) is a British actor and singer. He is known for appearing in the ITV drama series London's Burning and for releasing a cover of the song "Wind Beneath My Wings", famously sung by Bette Midler, in 1997.

== Early life, career and family ==
Born in Barnsley, West Riding, Houghton trained at the Northern School of Contemporary Dance in Leeds. His first West End production was Children of Eden. Additional London credits include Cats, Hot Mikado, Martin Guerre, Blood Brothers and Spend Spend Spend, for which he was nominated for the Laurence Olivier Award. He has toured the UK in Grease, Miss Saigon and Annie Get Your Gun.

Houghton's television credits include regular roles in London's Burning, Bugs, Holby City and Bernard's Watch, a guest role in Doctors and an appearance on French National Television singing the title role in The Phantom of the Opera.

Houghton spent time in Ireland playing several roles in a film workshop for new and established directors, including Stephen Frears and Jude Kelly.

He is also patron of Footloose Stage School.

In January 2011, it was revealed he would join the cast of Coronation Street as a love interest for Sally Webster. His first appearance on screen was in February 2011 and his last on 4 November 2011.

== Filmography ==
=== TV ===
Television
Year	Title	Role	Notes
1991	Prisoner of Honor	Male Prostitute	(TV Movie), credited as Stephen Houghton
1996	Alive and Kicking	Dancer	Drama film, credited as Stephen Houghton
1997-1998	London's Burning	Gregg Blake	(TV Series), 18 episodes
1998	The New Adventures of Robin Hood	Capt. Barker	(TV Series), 1 episode: "Assault on Castle Dundeen", credited as Stephen Houghton
1998-1999	Bugs	Ed Russell	(TV Series), 10 episodes
2002	Holby City	Scott Bridges	(TV Series), 1 episode: "Sweet Love Remembered"
2003-2017	Doctors	Brett Gray (2003) / Drew Evans (2011) / Michael Cunningham (2017)	(TV Series), 3 episodes: "All the Lonely People", "Stealing His Thunder" and "A Duty of Care"
2004	Bernard's Watch (TV Series)	Ken Beasley	(TV Series), 10 episodes
2011	Coronation Street (TV Series)	Jeff Cullen	(TV Series), 34 episodes
2011	Just Rosie	Jeff Cullen	(TV Short, credited as Steve Houghton)

== Music career ==
In 1997, Houghton released his eponymous debut album for BMG/RCA, which sold 200,000 copies and earned him a gold disc. The first single from the album, a cover version of the song "Wind Beneath My Wings", reached No. 3 on the UK Singles Chart, while his rendition of Lionel Richie's 1982 song "Truly" reached #23 in 1998.

Houghton was also the first winner of a Stars in Their Eyes celebrity episode, impersonating Tony Hadley of Spandau Ballet and singing the hit song "Gold".

== Discography ==
=== Studio albums ===
Date	Title	Chart positions
Date	Title	UK
17 November 1997	Steven Houghton: Debut studio album	No. 21

=== Singles ===
Date	Title	Chart positions	Album
Date	Title	UK	Album
17 November 1997	"Wind Beneath My Wings"	No. 3	Steven Houghton
23 February 1998	"Truly"	No. 23	Steven Houghton
