= List of Billboard Adult Contemporary number ones of 1982 =

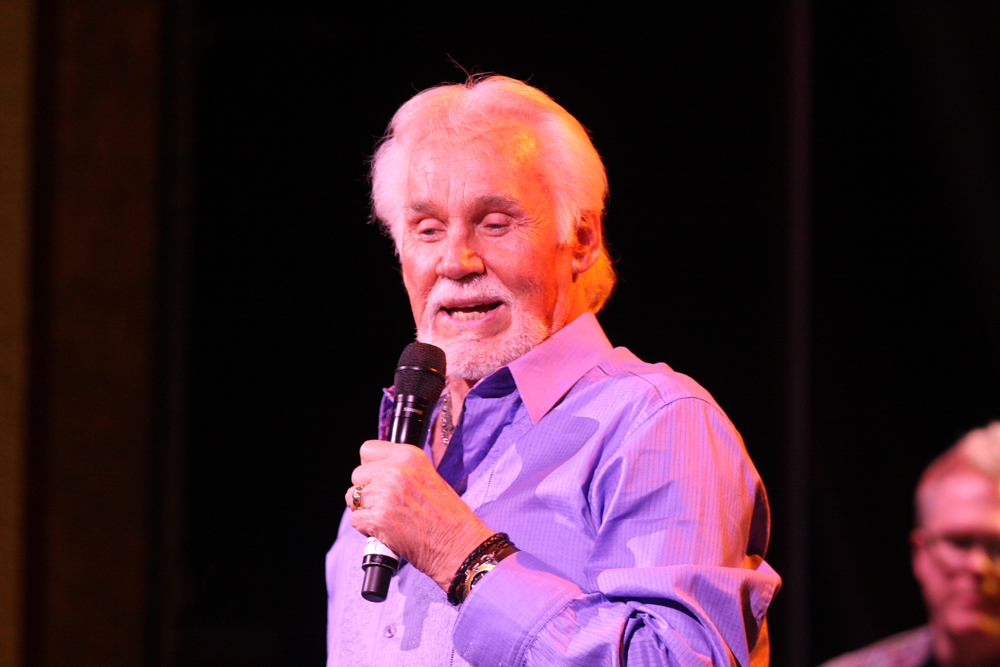
Kenny Rogers had two number ones in 1982.

In 1982, Billboard magazine published a chart ranking the top-performing songs in the United States in the adult contemporary music (AC) market. The chart, which in 1982 was published under the title Adult Contemporary, has undergone various name changes during its history but has again been published as Adult Contemporary since 1996. In 1982, 19 songs topped the chart based on playlists submitted by radio stations.

In the January 2 issue of Billboard, the number one position was held by Neil Diamond with "Yesterday's Songs", which was in its third week in the top spot. It remained atop the chart for four weeks in 1982 before being replaced by "The Sweetest Thing (I've Ever Known)" by Juice Newton, a re-recording of a song which had originally appeared on Newton's debut album in 1976. Diamond returned to number one in October with "Heartlight", which also spent four weeks in the peak position, and his total of eight weeks in the top spot was the most by any artist in 1982. Three songs tied for the longest unbroken run at number one during the year, each spending five weeks in the top spot. In April and May, the Greek composer and musician Vangelis spent five weeks at number one with "Chariots of Fire", the theme tune from the film of the same name for which he had won the Academy Award for Best Original Score in March. Later in the year, "Ebony and Ivory", a collaboration between Paul McCartney and Stevie Wonder, spent the same length of time at number one and was immediately followed into the top spot by the country singer Ronnie Milsap's recording of the 1962 song "Any Day Now", which achieved the same feat.

Four of 1982's AC number ones also topped Billboard's pop chart, the Hot 100. "Chariots of Fire" spent a single week atop the Hot 100 in May and was immediately followed into the top spot by "Ebony and Ivory", which held the position for seven weeks. In November, "Truly", the debut solo single from Lionel Richie, the lead singer of the Commodores, topped both listings and quickly launched Richie to superstardom. "Hard to Say I'm Sorry" by the band Chicago also reached the number one position on both charts. Conversely, John Denver's "Shanghai Breezes", which spent one week atop the AC listing in May, could only climb as high as number 31 on the Hot 100. Denver had been one of the biggest music stars of the 1970s, with eight AC and four pop number ones, but he did not sustain this level of success into the new decade: "Shanghai Breezes" would be his final top 20 appearance on the AC chart and his last song to reach the top 40 on the Hot 100. Following his chart-topping collaboration with Wonder, McCartney took a second duet to number one when "The Girl is Mine", on which he performed with Michael Jackson, reached the top spot on the final chart of 1982.

== Chart history ==
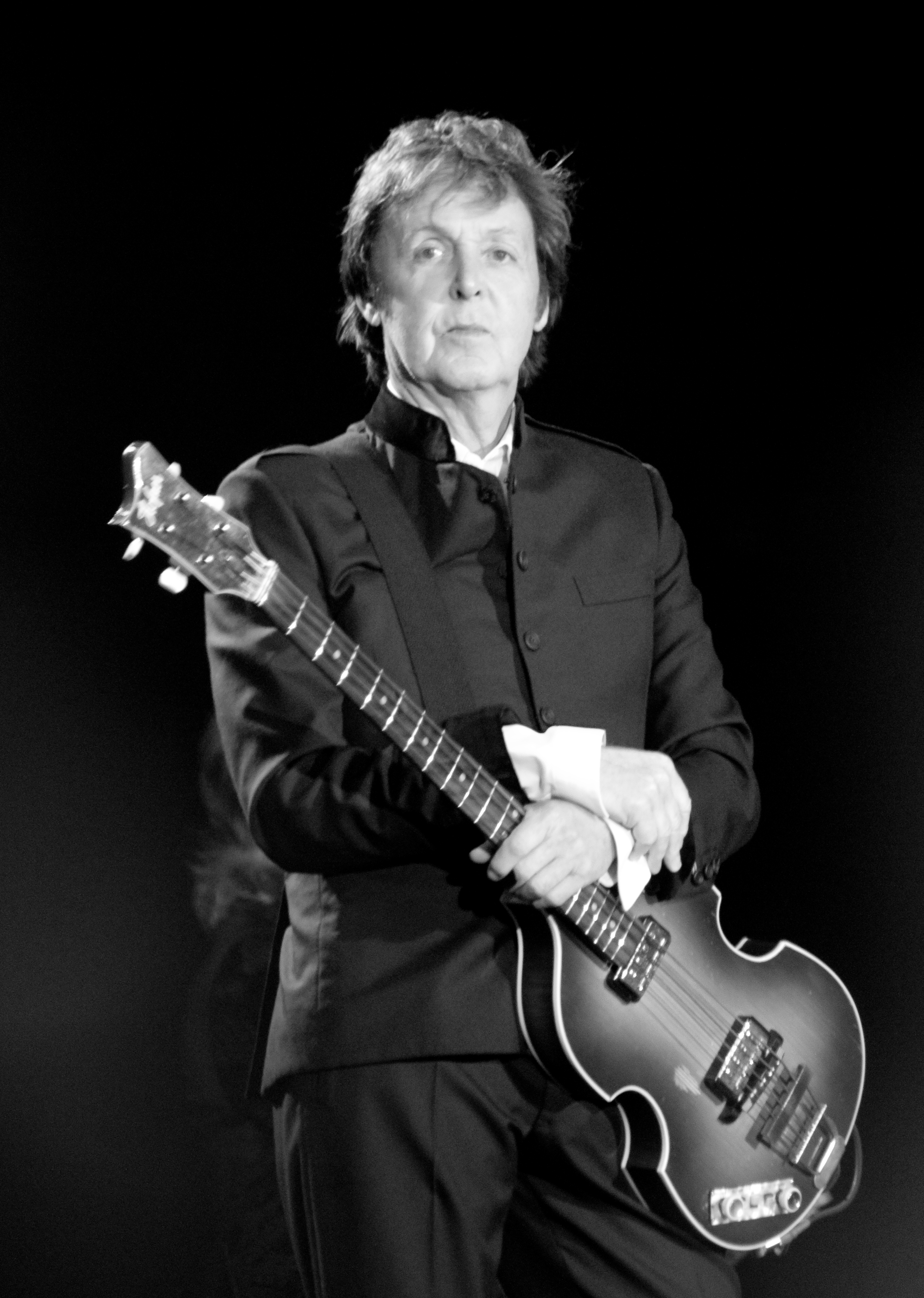
Paul McCartney reached number one with two different duet partners in 1982.

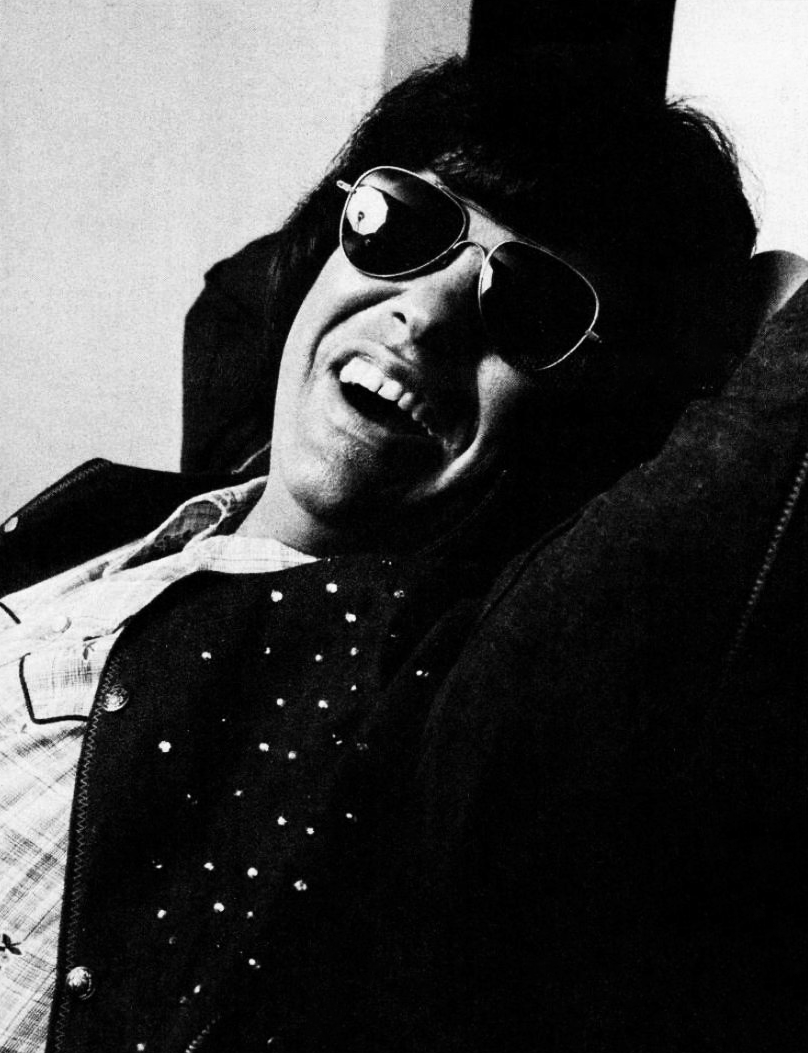
Ronnie Milsap's version of "Any Day Now" was one of three songs to spend five weeks at number one.

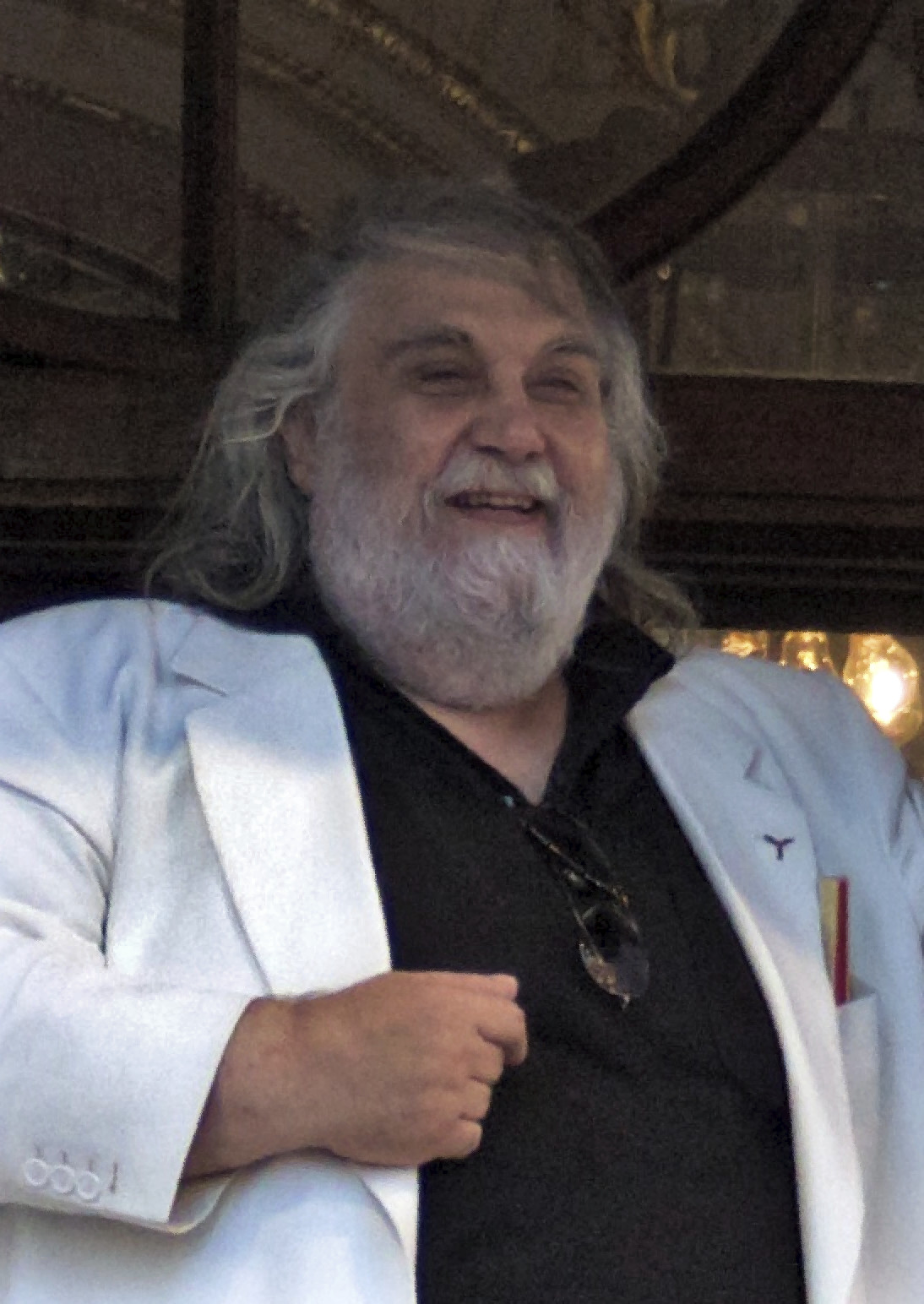
Vangelis had one of the year's longest-running number ones.

Chart history
Issue date	Title	Artist(s)	Ref.
January 2	"Yesterday's Songs"	Neil Diamond	
January 9	"Yesterday's Songs"	Neil Diamond	
January 16	"Yesterday's Songs"	Neil Diamond	
January 23	"Yesterday's Songs"	Neil Diamond	
January 30	"The Sweetest Thing (I've Ever Known)"	Juice Newton	
February 6	"Leader of the Band"	Dan Fogelberg	
February 13	"Leader of the Band"	Dan Fogelberg	
February 20	"Somewhere Down the Road"	Barry Manilow	
February 27	"Somewhere Down the Road"	Barry Manilow	
March 6	"Through the Years"	Kenny Rogers	
March 13	"Through the Years"	Kenny Rogers	
March 20	"Key Largo"	Bertie Higgins	
March 27	"Key Largo"	Bertie Higgins	
April 3	"Chariots of Fire"	Vangelis	
April 10	"Chariots of Fire"	Vangelis	
April 17	"Chariots of Fire"	Vangelis	
April 24	"Chariots of Fire"	Vangelis	
May 1	"Chariots of Fire"	Vangelis	
May 8	"Shanghai Breezes"	John Denver	
May 15	"Ebony and Ivory"	Paul McCartney and Stevie Wonder	
May 22	"Ebony and Ivory"	Paul McCartney and Stevie Wonder	
May 29	"Ebony and Ivory"	Paul McCartney and Stevie Wonder	
June 5	"Ebony and Ivory"	Paul McCartney and Stevie Wonder	
June 12	"Ebony and Ivory"	Paul McCartney and Stevie Wonder	
June 19	"Any Day Now"	Ronnie Milsap	
June 26	"Any Day Now"	Ronnie Milsap	
July 3	"Any Day Now"	Ronnie Milsap	
July 10	"Any Day Now"	Ronnie Milsap	
July 17	"Any Day Now"	Ronnie Milsap	
July 24	"Even the Nights Are Better"	Air Supply	
July 31	"Even the Nights Are Better"	Air Supply	
August 7	"Even the Nights Are Better"	Air Supply	
August 14	"Even the Nights Are Better"	Air Supply	
August 21	"Hard to Say I'm Sorry"	Chicago	
August 28	"Hard to Say I'm Sorry"	Chicago	
September 4	"Hard to Say I'm Sorry"	Chicago	
September 11	"Blue Eyes"	Elton John	
September 18	"Blue Eyes"	Elton John	
September 25	"Love Will Turn You Around"	Kenny Rogers	
October 2	"Love Will Turn You Around"	Kenny Rogers	
October 9	"Break It to Me Gently"	Juice Newton	
October 16	"Break It to Me Gently"	Juice Newton	
October 23	"Heartlight"	Neil Diamond	
October 30	"Heartlight"	Neil Diamond	
November 6	"Heartlight"	Neil Diamond	
November 13	"Heartlight"	Neil Diamond	
November 20	"Truly"	Lionel Richie	
November 27	"Truly"	Lionel Richie	
December 4	"Truly"	Lionel Richie	
December 11	"Truly"	Lionel Richie	
December 18	"Heartbreaker"	Dionne Warwick	
December 25	"The Girl Is Mine"	Michael Jackson and Paul McCartney	
