= Lionel Richie (album) =

Studio album by Lionel Richie
- Released: October 6, 1982
- Recorded: 1981–1982
- Studios: A&M Studios (Hollywood, California); Motown/Hitsville U.S.A. Recording Studios (Los Angeles, California)
- Genre: Pop soul
- Length: 38:27
- Label: Motown
- Producers: James Anthony Carmichael; Lionel Richie

Lionel Richie chronology
Lionel Richie (1982)	Can't Slow Down (1983)

Singles from Lionel Richie
- 1. "Truly" Released: September 1982; 2. "You Are" Released: January 1983; 3. "My Love" Released: April 1983

Professional ratings
Review scores
Source	Rating
AllMusic	4.5/5 stars
Robert Christgau	C+
Rolling Stone	4/5 stars

Lionel Richie is the self-titled debut solo studio album by American singer-songwriter Lionel Richie, released on October 6, 1982, on Motown. Originally intended as a side project at the suggestion of Motown, it was recorded and released while Richie was still a member of the Commodores; he left the group shortly after the album's release. Eagles member Joe Walsh provided the guitar solo for the song "Wandering Stranger". The first single from the album, "Truly", topped the Billboard Hot 100. The follow-up single "You Are" reached number four, and "My Love" reached number five. The album reached number one on the Cashbox albums chart on December 11, 1982.

In 2003, Lionel Richie was re-released as part of a remaster series that saw two additional tracks added: a solo version of "Endless Love" and an instrumental version of "You Are".

== Track listing ==
All tracks are written by Lionel Richie, except where noted.

Side one
No.	Title	Writer(s)	Length
1.	"Serves You Right"	John McClain; Greg Phillinganes; Richie	5:14
2.	"Wandering Stranger"		5:38
3.	"Tell Me"	Richie; David Cochrane	5:32
4.	"My Love"		4:08

Side two
No.	Title	Writer(s)	Length
5.	"Round and Round"	Cochrane; Richie	4:57
6.	"Truly"		3:26
7.	"You Are"	Brenda Harvey-Richie; Richie	5:05
8.	"You Mean More to Me"		3:08
9.	"Just Put Some Love in Your Heart"		1:27
Total length:			38:27

2003 remaster bonus tracks
No.	Title	Writer(s)	Length
10.	"Endless Love" (solo demo)		3:58
11.	"You Are" (instrumental)	Harvey-Richie; Richie	5:06
Total length:			54:37

== Personnel ==
Musicians

- Lionel Richie – lead vocals, backing vocals (1–3, 5–8), acoustic piano (4, 6, 8), Fender Rhodes (7)
- Greg Phillinganes – Fender Rhodes (1), Roland Jupiter-8 (1), Minimoog (1)
- Clarence McDonald – Fender Rhodes (2)
- Michael Lang – acoustic piano (2, 9), Fender Rhodes (9)
- David Cochrane – Prophet-5 (3), electric guitar (3, 7), synthesizer bass (3, 7), backing vocals (3, 7), acoustic piano (5), bass guitar (5), saxophone solo (5)
- Michael Boddicker – synthesizers (3, 5, 8), vocoder (3, 5, 8)
- Bill Payne – Fender Rhodes (6)
- Thomas Dolby [uncredited] – synthesizer programming (7), backing vocals (7)
- James Anthony Carmichael – celeste (8)
- Paul Jackson Jr. – electric guitar (1, 2, 6)
- Fred Tackett – acoustic guitar (2)
- Joe Walsh – guitar solo (2)
- Richie Zito – guitar solo (3)
- Darrell Jones – electric guitar (4, 5, 7), acoustic guitar (8)
- Tim May – acoustic guitar (6)
- Nathan Watts – bass guitar (1)
- Joe Chemay – bass guitar (2, 6, 8)
- Nathan East – bass guitar (4)
- John Robinson – drums (1, 5, 7)
- Leon "Ndugu" Chancler – drums (2, 4)
- Paul Leim – drums (3, 6, 8)
- Lenny Castro – percussion (1)
- Paulinho da Costa – percussion (2, 5, 7)
- Rick Shlosser – percussion (5)
- Howard Kenney – backing vocals (1, 5, 7)
- Richard Marx – backing vocals (1, 2, 7, 8)
- Deborah Thomas – backing vocals (2, 3, 5, 7)
- Jimmy Connors – backing vocals (3)
- Kenny Rogers – backing vocals (4)
- Kin Vassy – backing vocals (4)
- Terry Williams – backing vocals (4)

Music arrangements

- Lionel Richie – all vocal arrangements, rhythm arrangements (7)
- Greg Phillinganes – arrangements (1)
- Gene Page – arrangements (2, 6, 9)
- James Anthony Carmichael – arrangements (3–5, 8), string arrangements (3, 7), horn arrangements (7), rhythm arrangements (7)
- David Cochrane – arrangements (3, 5)
- Kenny Rogers – BGV arrangement (4)

Horns, strings and woodwinds

Horns and woodwinds

- Louise Di Tullo – flute (3, 6, 9)
- Don Ashworth – woodwinds (4, 8)
- Gene Cipriano – woodwinds (4, 8)
- Gary Herbig – woodwinds (4, 8), saxophones (5, 7)
- Larry Williams – woodwinds (4, 8)
- William Green – saxophones (5, 7)
- Ernie Watts – saxophones (5, 7)
- Lew McCreary – trombone (4, 5, 7, 8)
- Bill Reichenbach Jr. – trombone (4, 5, 7, 8)
- Gary Grant – trumpet (4, 5, 7, 8)
- Jerry Hey – trumpet (4, 5, 7, 8)
- Walter Johnson – trumpet (4, 5, 7, 8)
- Warren Luening – trumpet (4, 5, 7, 8)
- Bob Findley – trumpet (5, 7)
- Art Maebe – French horn (3, 4, 6, 8, 9)
- Richard Perissi – French horn (3, 6, 9)
- Henry Sigismonti – French horn (3, 6, 9)
- Jim Atkinson – French horn (4, 8)
- David Duke – French horn (4, 8)
- Brian O'Connor – French horn (4, 8)

String sections

- Harry Bluestone – concertmaster (2–9)
- Jesse Ehrlich – cello (2, 3, 6, 9)
- Armand Kaproff – cello (2, 3, 6, 9)
- Paula Hochhalter – cello (2, 6, 9)
- Dennis Karmazyn – cello (2, 6, 9)
- Arni Egilsson – double bass (2, 6, 9)
- Buell Neidlinger – double bass (2, 6, 9)
- Gayle Levant – harp (2, 4–9)
- Alan DeVeritch – viola (2, 3, 6, 9)
- Allan Harshman – viola (2, 3, 6, 9)
- Virginia Majewski – viola (2, 3, 6, 9)
- Gareth Nuttycombe – viola (2, 3, 6, 9)
- Bonnie Douglas – violin (2, 3, 6, 9)
- Assa Drori – violin (2, 3, 6, 9)
- Endre Granat – violin (2, 3, 6, 9)
- Joy Lyle – violin (2, 3, 6, 9)
- Donald Palmer – violin (2, 3, 6, 9)
- Henry Roth – violin (2, 3, 6, 9)
- Sheldon Sanov – violin (2, 3, 6, 9)
- Jack Shulman – violin (2, 3, 6, 9)
- Paul Shure – violin (2, 3, 6, 9)
- Mari Tsumura-Botnick – violin (2, 3, 6, 9), strings (4, 5, 7, 8)
- Charles Veal Jr. – violin (2, 3, 6, 9)
- Ray Brown – string bass (4, 5, 7, 8)
- Morty Corb – string bass (4, 5, 7, 8)
- Rollice Dale – strings (4, 5, 7, 8)
- Henry Ferber – strings (4, 5, 7, 8)
- Ronald Folsom – strings (4, 5, 7, 8)
- William Henderson – strings (4, 5, 7, 8)
- William Kurasch – strings (4, 5, 7, 8)
- Erno Neufeld – strings (4, 5, 7, 8)
- Nathan Ross – strings (4, 5, 7, 8)
- Myron Sandler – strings (4, 5, 7, 8)
- David Schwartz – strings (4, 5, 7, 8)
- Fred Seykora – strings (4, 5, 7, 8)
- David Speltz – strings (4, 5, 7, 8)
- Tibor Zelig – strings (4, 5, 7, 8)

== Production ==
- James Anthony Carmichael – producer
- Lionel Richie – producer
- Calvin Harris – recording, mixing
- Jane Clark – additional mixing
- Jim Cassell – second recording engineer
- Michael Johnson – second mix engineer
- Fred Law – second mix engineer
- Stephan Smith – second mix engineer
- Bernie Grundman – mastering at A&M Studios
- Brenda Harvey-Richie – production assistant
- Rita Leigh – creative assistant
- Johnny Lee – art direction
- David Alexander – photography

== Charts ==
=== Weekly charts ===
Chart (1982–83)	Peak position
Australia (Kent Music Report)	18
Canada Top Albums/CDs (RPM)	5
Dutch Albums (Album Top 100)	21
New Zealand Albums (RMNZ)	3
Swedish Albums (Sverigetopplistan)	41
UK Albums (Official Charts)	9
US Billboard 200	3
US Top R&B/Hip-Hop Albums (Billboard)	1

=== Year-end charts ===
Chart (1983)	Position
Canada Top Albums/CDs (RPM)	11
Dutch Albums (Album Top 100)	59
New Zealand Albums (RMNZ)	9
US Billboard 200	6
US Top R&B/Hip-Hop Albums (Billboard)	3
Chart (1984)	Position
US Billboard 200	33

== Certifications and sales ==
Region	Certification	Certified units/sales
Canada (Music Canada)	4× Platinum	400,000^{^}
Hong Kong (IFPI Hong Kong)	Gold	10,000^{*}
South Africa	—	100,000
United Kingdom (BPI)	Platinum	300,000^{^}
United States (RIAA)	4× Platinum	4,000,000^{^}
^{*} Sales figures based on certification alone.^{^} Shipments figures based on certification alone.
