= Bugs (TV series) =

- Bugs intertitle
- Genre: Action; Adventure; Science fiction
- Created by: Brian Eastman
- Directed by: John Stroud
- Starring: Jaye Griffiths; Craig McLachlan; Jesse Birdsall; Jan Harvey; Paula Hunt; Steven Houghton
- Country of origin: United Kingdom
- Original language: English
- No. of series: 4
- No. of episodes: 40

Production
- Executive producers: Caroline Oulton; Tony Dennis
- Producers: Brian Eastman; Stuart Doughty
- Running time: 50 minutes

Original release
- Network: BBC One
- Release: 1 April 1995 – 28 August 1999

Bugs is a British television science fiction drama that ran for four series from 1 April 1995 to 28 August 1999. The programme, a mixture of action/adventure and science fiction, involved a team of independent crime-fighting technology experts, who faced a variety of threats involving computers and other modern technology. It was originally broadcast on Saturday evenings on BBC One, and was produced for the BBC by the independent production company Carnival Films. In July 2014, London Live, a local digital terrestrial station in London, began airing a complete rerun from Series 1. All four series (40 episodes) were available to stream in the UK on Britbox until Britbox UK ceased operations in April 2024 with its content migrating to ITVX; however, Bugs was not a part of that migration.

== Origins ==
The series was devised by Carnival boss Brian Eastman and producer Stuart Doughty with input from veteran writer-producer Brian Clemens, who had previously worked on ITV's The Avengers and The Professionals. Clemens, in an article published in Radio Times, described Bugs as a mix of the two: "Bugs is the driving technology, that hard realistic edge of The Professionals, allied to Avenger-ish dramatic premises. Maybe it’s where The Avengers would have ended up". Unlike The Avengers, which had sold itself on its Britishness, Clemens accepted that the Bugs backdrop was deliberately international. “We’ve avoided references to actual cities. If it’s dubbed into Italian, I hope they will think it’s Milan. […] Londoners will recognise it, but there’s no Big Ben and no Tower of London. Just super modern builds wherever possible.”

Other notable series writers included Colin Brake and Stephen Gallagher, who also served as a consultant on seasons two and three. Two episodes ("Bugged Wheat" and "Hollow Man"), were written by Alfred Gough and Miles Millar, who went on to create the series Smallville and Wednesday. The theme tune was written by Gavin Greenaway.

Bugs was initially broadcast at 8.05pm and promoted by the BBC as part of its new Saturday night line-up, followed by a news bulletin, US medical drama Chicago Hope and a new comedy sketch and stand-up show starring Lenny Henry.

== Overview ==
The programme was a mixture of action/adventure and science fiction, with a reliance on fast-paced plots, technical gadgetry, stunts and explosions. Much of the programme's filming took place around the London Docklands area, which had recently been redeveloped with projects such as Canary Wharf. This was intended to give a modern, and perhaps even slightly futuristic, feel to locations of the episodes. The production was originally based at two warehouses of Blackwall Basin, on the Isle of Dogs in London. After the IRA bombing of the South Quay Plaza, the crew had to travel further to find intact buildings for exterior locations.

The plot of the programme involved a team of specialist independent crime-fighting technology experts, who faced a variety of threats involving computers and other modern technology. The main trio of regulars were Nick Beckett (Jesse Birdsall, fresh from the BBC’s failed soap opera Eldorado), Ros Henderson (Jaye Griffiths) and Ed (Craig McLachlan, previously best known for his role in Neighbours, in series one to three; Steven Houghton in series four). There has been some controversy over Ed's surname: because he was never called anything other than "Ed", some people have taken his surname to be Russell, simply because he was addressed as "Dr Russell" in one episode. However, that was more likely a pseudonym, as both Ros and Beckett used plenty of false names throughout the series.

Initially an independent team, they began working alongside the government agency 'Bureau of Weapons Technology' in series two. From series three, with the original Bureau decimated, they came under the authority of the newly created 'Bureau 2' and its head, codenamed Jan (played by Jan Harvey), and her secretary, Alex Jordan (Paula Hunt).

Across its four seasons, Bugs evolved from a series of relatively unconnected one-off episodes to an overarching 'soap opera', complete with office romances.

== Threat of cancellation ==
The programme came close to cancellation at the conclusion of its third series but, due to an exciting cliffhanger ending deliberately included by the production team, along with strong foreign sales, a fourth was commissioned. However, this final series suffered from being moved to an earlier timeslot on Saturday evenings, and for only having the first eight of its produced ten episodes scheduled for broadcast.

Coupled with the Omagh Bombing forcing the BBC to postpone the series for a week, this meant that the concluding three episodes would not be broadcast until a year later. Another attempt to save the show by giving the series a cliffhanger ending was not successful. The conclusion of the final episode – Alex has just married boyfriend Adam, who is killed at the wedding, while Ros and Beckett are abducted by an attacker (unseen by the audience but recognised by Beckett) – was never resolved.

== Legacy ==
The series has something of a minor cult following in the UK. Overall 40 episodes were produced, ten in each of the four series. Virgin Publishing produced novelizations of the episodes of the first series, but these were not successful and subsequent episodes were not novelised. As of 2005, the series is available on DVD in series-by-series box set form, released by Revelation Films. A complete box set collection of all four series is also available. In 2022, the series became available on the BritBox streaming platform where it could be accessed until April 2024..

== Cast ==
- Jaye Griffiths as Rosalyn "Ros" Henderson
- Jesse Birdsall as Nicholas Beckett
- Craig McLachlan as Ed (Series 1–3)
- Jan Harvey as Jan (Series 3–4)
- Paula Hunt as Alex Jordan (Series 3–4)
- Martin McDougall as Lacombe (Series 1–2)
- Steven Houghton as Ed (Series 4)
- Gareth Marks as Jean-Daniel Marcel (Series 1–2)
- Michael Grandage as Channing Hardy (Series 3–4)
- Joseph May as Adam Mosby (Series 4)

== Episodes ==
=== Series overview ===
Series	Episodes	Originally released	
Series	Episodes	First released	Last released
1	10	1 April 1995	10 June 1995
2	10	6 April 1996	22 June 1996
3	10	19 July 1997	27 September 1997
4	10	11 July 1998	28 August 1999

=== Series 1 (1995) ===
No. overall	No. in series	Title	Directed by	Written by	Original release date
1	1	"Out of the Hive"	Brian Farnham	Duncan Gould	1 April 1995
Helicopter pilot Ed, electronics expert Ros Henderson and government agent Nick Beckett find themselves working together in an attempt to prevent the theft of a powerful satellite device from a government agency.
2	2	"Assassins Inc."	Ken Grieve	Stephen Gallagher	8 April 1995
When Ed, Ros and Beckett set out on a mission to bring down hi-tech weapons dealer Irene Campbell, she targets the team with her latest and most lethal technology.
3	3	"All Under Control"	Brian Farnham	Duncan Gould	15 April 1995
When a passenger aircraft is hijacked by remote control, the Gizmos team is called in to investigate the plane's state-of-the-art navigation system.
4	4	"Down Among the Dead Men"	Andrew Grieve	Stephen Gallagher	22 April 1995
Hired to investigate the link between the theft of ship components and the former employee of a large city bank, the Gizmos team encounter theft, murder, and a bank heist by submarine.
5	5	"Shotgun Wedding"	Ken Grieve	Amanda Coe, Colin Brake (uncredited rewrite)	29 April 1995
When the team's plan to protect Italian politician Anna Fabrizi from a lethal assassin goes horribly wrong, Ed is forced to go undercover and must make an impossible decision – kill Anna Fabrizi or die.
6	6	"Stealth"	Ken Grieve	Stephen Gallagher	6 May 1995
When Gizmos are hired to provide security for the launch of a new sports car, they instead become caught up in the theft of a prototype nuclear-powered stealth tank, which could destroy the city if not recovered. Note: The next episode would be shown two weeks later owing to the BBC's live coverage of the Eurovision Song Contest 1995.
7	7	"Manna from Heaven"	Brian Farnham	Gregory Evans	20 May 1995
Phodex is a revolutionary type of food which could end world famine. When an attempt is made to steal samples, Gizmos are called in to investigate – and they discover that Phodex holds a deadly secret.
8	8	"Hot Metal"	Ken Grieve	Alan Whiting	27 May 1995
When a new type of metal is discovered to have explosive properties, Gizmos are brought in to prevent its theft by a mercenary who has developed a way to silence explosions.
9	9	"A Sporting Chance"	Ken Grieve	Colin Brake	3 June 1995
Gizmos encounter the sinister plans of mercenary Colonel Easterhaus when they investigate the collapse of several athletes at a sports institution.
10	10	"Pulse"	Brian Farnham	Stephen Gallagher	10 June 1995
Whilst investigating the disappearance of several company executives, Ed, Ros and Beckett stumble on to a plan to destroy the economic centres of London and Geneva, devised by a criminal mastermind.

=== Series 2 (1996) ===
No. overall	No. in series	Title	Directed by	Written by	Original release date
11	1	"What Goes Up..."	Brian Farnham	Colin Brake	6 April 1996
Ed goes undercover on a space programme to oversee the deployment of a new satellite, but, as the seconds tick down to the launch, a saboteur prepares to strike.
12	2	"...Must Come Down"	Brian Farnham	Colin Brake	13 April 1996
Whilst Ed is stranded aboard the crippled shuttle, Ros and Beckett attempt to unmask the saboteur within Ground Control. Meanwhile, a more deadly enemy resurfaces.
13	3	"Bugged Wheat"	Sandy Johnson	Miles Millar & Alfred Gough	20 April 1996
The team comes up against a pesticide company's dastardly scheme to spread worldwide famine, using genetically engineered insects infected with a deadly viroid.
14	4	"Whirling Dervish"	Andrew Grieve	Colin Brake (uncredited rewrite)	27 April 1996
When a consortium of airlines plans to use a VTOL stealth plane to bring down a rival passenger airline, Ed goes undercover as a fighter pilot. Meanwhile, the team realise that someone is manipulating them.
15	5	"Blackout"	Andrew Grieve	Frank De Palma & Terry Borst	4 May 1996
A guided tour of a hi-tech nuclear power station turns into a hostage crisis for Ros when the building is stormed by eco-terrorists. However, the situation is not what it seems.
16	6	"Gold Rush"	Andrew Grieve	Bruno Heller & Alison Leathart	11 May 1996
The Monetary Commission recruits the team when a microbe is released into their gold vault which will literally eat the gold. Whilst Ros goes after the antidote, Ed becomes trapped in the vault as lethal security countermeasures are activated. Note: The next episode would be postponed for two weeks owing to the BBC's live coverage of the Eurovision Song Contest 1996.
17	7	"Schrodinger's Bomb"	Andrew Grieve	Stephen Gallagher	25 May 1996
The team infiltrate a duo of arms dealers for the Bureau, but fall foul of the building's explosive security system, which arms to prevent them entering the vault; the only way to prove their guilt may be to blow up the evidence.
18	8	"Newton's Run"	Brian Farnham	Calvin Clements Jnr.	1 June 1996
Nordic terrorists steal a cybernetically-enhanced dog named Newton to place a bomb in a weapons store which will vaporise much of the city.
19	9	"The Bureau of Weapons"	Andrew Grieve	Stephen Gallagher	8 June 1996
The Gizmos team race to stop Jean-Daniel after he unleashes an artificial intelligence across the Internet – leading Ros to make a terrible sacrifice.
20	10	"A Cage for Satan"	Brian Farnham	Stephen Gallagher	22 June 1996
As Jean-Daniel puts the final stages of his master-plan into action, Ed and Beckett must prevent Ros from unwittingly activating the deadly computer virus stored within her mind. Note: This episode was meant to be broadcast on 15 June 1996 but was postponed due to a bombing in Manchester earlier in the day.

=== Series 3 (1997) ===
No. overall	No. in series	Title	Directed by	Written by	Original release date
21	1	"Blaze of Glory"	John Stroud	Stephen Gallagher	19 July 1997
During an investigation at a construction site, the team discover a cache of unstable chemical weapons – with disastrous results.
22	2	"The Revenge Effect"	Gwennan Sage	Stephen Gallagher	26 July 1997
Ed's life is placed in danger when an old enemy returns seeking vengeance.
23	3	"The Price of Peace"	John Stroud	Frank De Palma	2 August 1997
The peace of Eastern Europe is put at risk when an experimental electromagnetic weapon is stolen during a Bureau testing exercise.
24	4	"Hollow Man"	Gwennan Sage	Miles Millar & Alfred Gough	9 August 1997
A master print disk goes missing, days before the introduction of a brand new bank note.
25	5	"Nuclear Family"	John Stroud	Colin Brake (uncredited)	16 August 1997
Bureau 2 is called upon to protect a targeted Russian politician who controls an arsenal of nuclear weapons.
26	6	"Fugitive"	Clive Hopkins	Matthew Evans	23 August 1997
The team are placed under suspicion when damning evidence reveals one has been dealing weapons.
27	7	"Happy Ever After?"	John Stroud	Colin Brake & Clive Hopkins (uncredited)	30 August 1997
When eco terrorists target a water pumping station, they find the perfect leverage.
28	8	"Buried Treasure"	Matthew Evans	Terry Borst	13 September 1997
Ed's loyalties are strained when an old flame turns up and needs his services for a special job. Note: This episode was due to broadcast on 6 September 1997, although it was postponed by a week following the funeral of Diana, Princess of Wales.
29	9	"Identity Crisis"	John Stroud	Colin Brake	20 September 1997
A new Jan takes charge of the Bureau, but what happened to the old one?
30	10	"Renegades"	Matthew Evans	Stephen Gallagher	27 September 1997
The survivors of the Cyberax incident awake from their comas and set about completing their plan – the installation of Cyberax onto the internet.

=== Series 4 (1998–1999) ===
No. overall	No. in series	Title	Directed by	Written by	Original release date	Viewers (millions)
31	1	"Absent Friends"	Gwennan Sage	Colin Brake	11 July 1998	5.98
Ros has mysteriously vanished and when her car is found in a river, Beckett is forced to resign. Elsewhere, a dormant eco-terrorist group reawakens when an enormously-powerful government minister begins dealing in bio-weapons.
32	2	"Sacrifice to Science"	Brian Grant	Colin Brake	18 July 1998	TBA
Ros is alive, but her unclear allegiances allow the minister to shut down Bureau 2, the only thing standing between him and vengeance. However, the team are never off the case for long...
33	3	"Girl Power"	Gwennan Sage	Colin Brake	25 July 1998	5.57
A fourteen-year-old techno-prodigy, Carly, breaks into the Hive out of boredom. She is assigned to Ros for mentoring into a tech school, but a certain duo decide to make use of the girl's technical prowess in a heist.
34	4	"The Two Becketts"	Brian Grant	Terry Borst	1 August 1998	5.62
Following a ten-year absence, Beckett's father comes back to him seeking help with a case against an international gangster, a man with enormous power and resources.
35	5	"Hell and High Water"	Christopher King	Alex Stewart	8 August 1998	TBA
Contact with a satellite monitoring rig is lost and a satellite is due to reenter the atmosphere, which would be catastrophic unless its self-destruct is activated. The team board the rig, but discover the crew are not who they claim to be.
36	6	"Pandora's Box"	Brian Grant	Frank De Palma	15 August 1998	TBA
A scholar seeks to prove his theory that a toxic waste dump was constructed over the tomb of King Arthur. In his haste to unearth the site, he releases a deadly bacterial plague that starts to kill again.
37	7	"Jewel Control"	John Stroud	Colin Brake	29 August 1998	TBA
A Colombian emerald baron plans to use an ancient Continuation of Government structure to rob an emerald exchange. Meanwhile, Jan's competence is assessed.
38	8	"Twin Geeks"	Brian Grant	Colin Brake	14 August 1999	TBA
Genius twin brothers Marcus and Michael, feeling used by their former employer and having their creations stolen, seek explosive revenge. Elsewhere, Ros finds Channing has sold her designs, and she has a matter of hours to buy them back.
39	9	"Money Spiders"	John Stroud	Terry Borst	21 August 1999	TBA
'Spiders', fragments of computer code designed to harvest secret information, dig up a government project to secure money transfers, and the owner decides to take full advantage, leading Adam to take drastic action to save Alex.
40	10	"The Enemy Within"	Brian Grant	Frank De Palma	28 August 1999	TBA
Ros's surgery is successful, if eventful, after Wyman infiltrates the hospital to run the CatFlap program. Alex and Adam make amends and their wedding goes ahead, but disaster is never far behind.
