= List of Billboard Adult Contemporary number ones of 1983 =

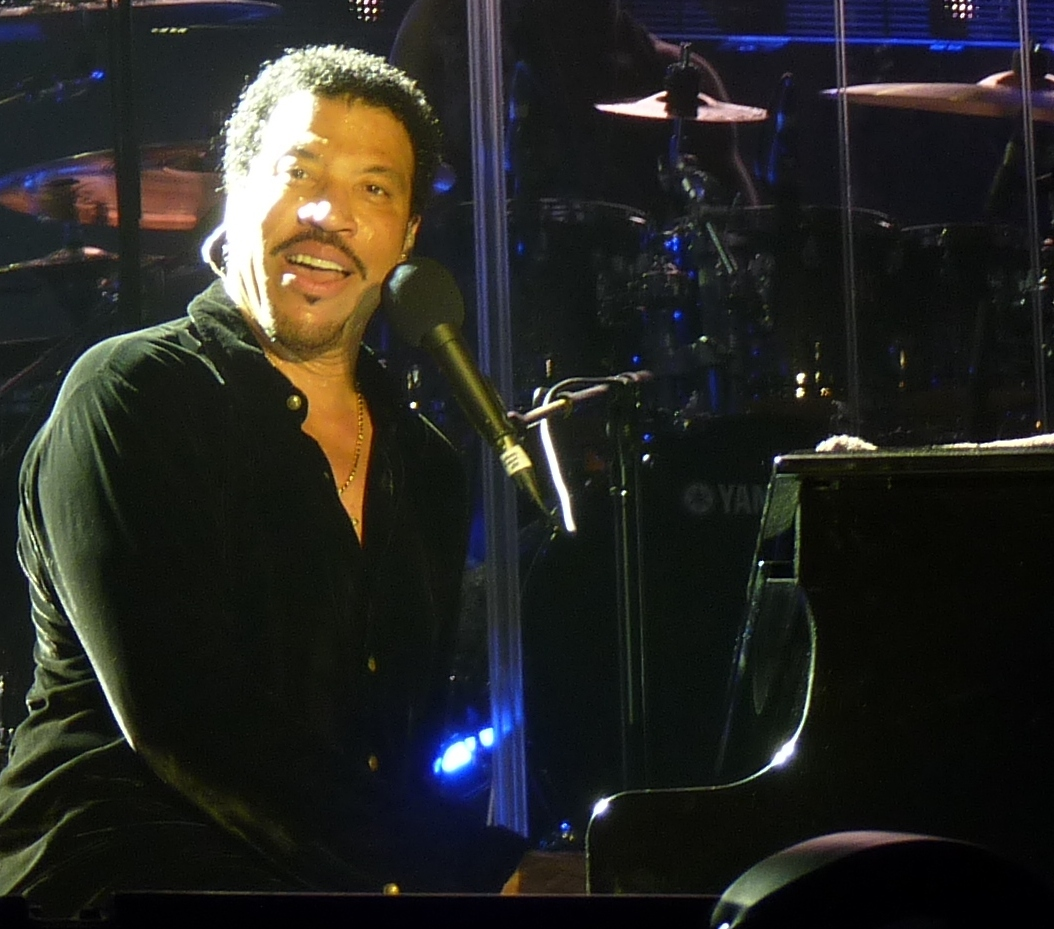
Lionel Richie (pictured in 2011) had three number ones in 1983.

In 1983, Billboard magazine published a chart ranking the top-performing songs in the United States in the adult contemporary music (AC) market. The chart, which in 1983 was published under the title Adult Contemporary, has undergone various name changes during its history but has again been published as Adult Contemporary since 1996. In 1983, 18 songs topped the chart based on playlists submitted by radio stations.

In the January 1 issue of Billboard the number one position was held by "The Girl Is Mine" by Michael Jackson and Paul McCartney, which retained its position from the last chart of 1982. It held the top spot for three weeks in 1983 before being displaced by "Baby, Come to Me" by Patti Austin and James Ingram. The duet had originally been released early in the previous year and achieved little success. It was re-released after it was featured on the soap opera General Hospital, sparking renewed interest in the song which sent it to the top of both the AC listing and Billboard's pop chart, the Hot 100. Three other songs topped both charts in 1983, including Billy Joel's "Tell Her About It" and Kenny Rogers and Dolly Parton's duet "Islands in the Stream", the latter of which also reached number one on the Hot Country Singles listing. In 2005, "Islands in the Stream" topped a poll organized by the country music television channel CMT of the best country duets of all time.

The third song to be both a pop and AC number one in 1983 was "All Night Long (All Night)" by Lionel Richie, which also topped the Black Singles listing. Richie was the most successful act on the AC chart in 1983; he had three number ones and spent a total of fourteen weeks in the top spot. He was the only act to have more than one AC chart-topper during the year and also claimed the longest-running number one of 1983, spending six consecutive weeks atop the chart with "You Are". No other act spent more than four weeks at number one in total during the year. Richie, the lead singer of the Commodores, had launched his solo career the previous year and quickly reached superstar status. The final AC number one of 1983 was Barry Manilow's version of "Read 'Em and Weep", a song originally recorded by the hard rock singer Meat Loaf.

== Chart history ==
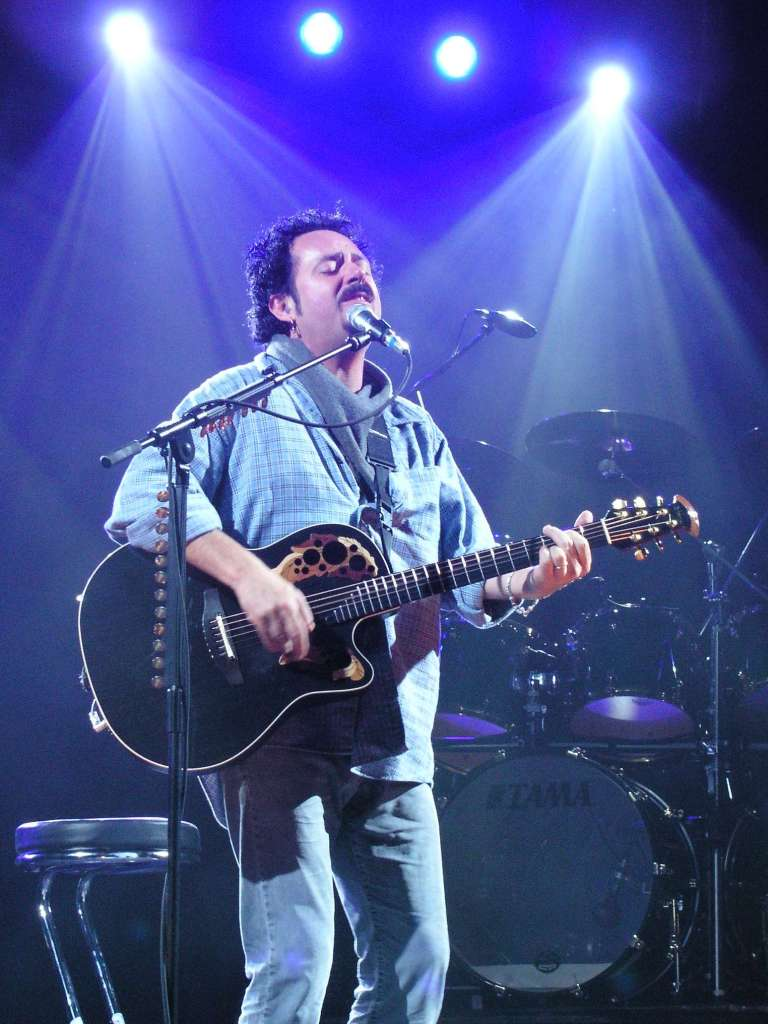
Toto (founder member Steve Lukather pictured in 2004) reached number one with "I Won't Hold You Back".

Patti Austin and James Ingram (pictured in 2000 and 1998 respectively) topped the chart with their duet "Baby, Come to Me".

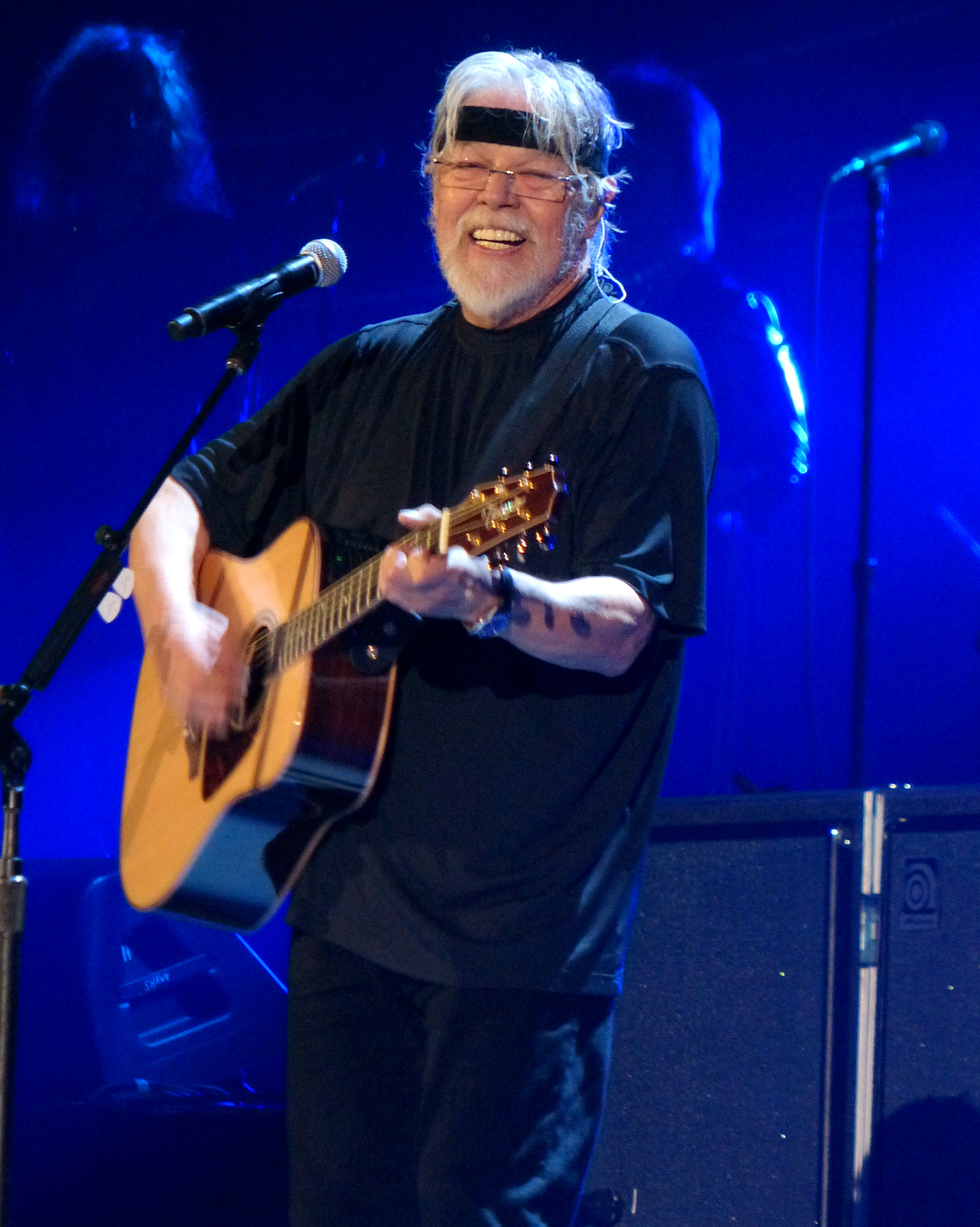
"Shame on the Moon" was a chart-topper for Bob Seger (pictured in 2013) and the Silver Bullet Band.

Chart history
Issue date	Title	Artist(s)	Ref.
January 1	"The Girl Is Mine"	Michael Jackson and Paul McCartney	
January 8	"The Girl Is Mine"	Michael Jackson and Paul McCartney	
January 15	"The Girl Is Mine"	Michael Jackson and Paul McCartney	
January 22	"Baby, Come to Me"	Patti Austin and James Ingram	
January 29	"Baby, Come to Me"	Patti Austin and James Ingram	
February 5	"Baby, Come to Me"	Patti Austin and James Ingram	
February 12	"Shame on the Moon"	Bob Seger and the Silver Bullet Band	
February 19	"Shame on the Moon"	Bob Seger and the Silver Bullet Band	
February 26	"You Are"	Lionel Richie	
March 5	"You Are"	Lionel Richie	
March 12	"You Are"	Lionel Richie	
March 19	"You Are"	Lionel Richie	
March 26	"You Are"	Lionel Richie	
April 2	"You Are"	Lionel Richie	
April 9	"Make Love Stay"	Dan Fogelberg	
April 16	"It Might Be You"	Stephen Bishop	
April 23	"It Might Be You"	Stephen Bishop	
April 30	"I Won't Hold You Back"	Toto	
May 7	"I Won't Hold You Back"	Toto	
May 14	"I Won't Hold You Back"	Toto	
May 21	"My Love"	Lionel Richie	
May 28	"My Love"	Lionel Richie	
June 4	"My Love"	Lionel Richie	
June 11	"My Love"	Lionel Richie	
June 18	"Never Gonna Let You Go"	Sérgio Mendes	
June 25	"Never Gonna Let You Go"	Sérgio Mendes	
July 2	"Never Gonna Let You Go"	Sérgio Mendes	
July 9	"Never Gonna Let You Go"	Sérgio Mendes	
July 16	"All This Love"	DeBarge	
July 23	"All This Love"	DeBarge	
July 30	"All This Love"	DeBarge	
August 6	"All Time High"	Rita Coolidge	
August 13	"All Time High"	Rita Coolidge	
August 20	"All Time High"	Rita Coolidge	
August 27	"All Time High"	Rita Coolidge	
September 3	"How Am I Supposed to Live Without You"	Laura Branigan	
September 10	"How Am I Supposed to Live Without You"	Laura Branigan	
September 17	"How Am I Supposed to Live Without You"	Laura Branigan	
September 24	"Tell Her About It"	Billy Joel	
October 1	"Tell Her About It"	Billy Joel	
October 8	"True"	Spandau Ballet	
October 15	"Islands in the Stream"	Kenny Rogers and Dolly Parton	
October 22	"Islands in the Stream"	Kenny Rogers and Dolly Parton	
October 29	"Islands in the Stream"	Kenny Rogers and Dolly Parton	
November 5	"Islands in the Stream"	Kenny Rogers and Dolly Parton	
November 12	"All Night Long (All Night)"	Lionel Richie	
November 19	"All Night Long (All Night)"	Lionel Richie	
November 26	"All Night Long (All Night)"	Lionel Richie	
December 3	"All Night Long (All Night)"	Lionel Richie	
December 10	"The Way He Makes Me Feel"	Barbra Streisand	
December 17	"The Way He Makes Me Feel"	Barbra Streisand	
December 24	"Read 'Em and Weep"	Barry Manilow	
December 31	"Read 'Em and Weep"	Barry Manilow	
