= My Love (Lionel Richie song) =

Single by Lionel Richie

from the album Lionel Richie
- B-side: "Round and Round"
- Released: April 1983
- Recorded: 1982
- Genre: Soft rock, country pop
- Length: 4:08
- Label: Motown
- Songwriter: Lionel Richie
- Producers: Lionel Richie; James Anthony Carmichael

Lionel Richie singles chronology
"You Are" (1983)	"My Love" (1983)	"All Night Long (All Night)" (1983)

Music video
- "Lionel Richie - My Love" on YouTube

"My Love" is a song by American singer-songwriter Lionel Richie. It was released in 1983 as the third and final single from his self-titled debut solo album. The song features harmony backing vocals by country music singer Kenny Rogers. It reached the top 10 on three notable Billboard magazine charts in the spring of 1983: on the Billboard Hot 100 the song peaked at No. 5; on the Adult Contemporary chart, the song spent four weeks at No. 1; and on the R&B chart, the song topped out at No. 6. "My Love" was not among Richie's more successful singles in the United Kingdom, where it only managed to reach No. 70 on the UK Singles Chart. In Canada, it peaked at No. 28 on the RPM Top 100 Singles chart.

Cash Box described "My Love" as being reminiscent of the Commodores' single "Easy."

A remake of the song was recorded and included on Richie's 2012 album Tuskegee, which features Kenny Chesney.

== Charts ==
=== Weekly charts ===
Chart (1983)	Peak position
Australia (Kent Music Report)	88
Canada RPM Adult Contemporary	1
Canada RPM Top Singles	28
UK Singles (OCC)	70
US Billboard Hot 100	5
US Billboard Adult Contemporary	1
US Billboard R&B	6
US Cash Box Top 100	9

=== Year-end charts ===
Chart (1983)	Rank
US Top Pop Singles (Billboard)	73
US Billboard Adult Contemporary	5
US Billboard R&B	59
US Cash Box	67

== See also ==
- List of number-one adult contemporary singles of 1983 (U.S.)
