= You Are (Lionel Richie song) =

Single by Lionel Richie

from the album Lionel Richie
- B-side: "You Mean More to Me"
- Released: January 1983
- Recorded: 1981
- Genre: Funk; pop
- Length: 5:05; 4:05 (7")
- Label: Motown
- Songwriter(s): Lionel Richie; Brenda Harvey Richie
- Producer(s): Lionel Richie; James Anthony Carmichael

Lionel Richie singles chronology
"Truly" (1982)	"You Are" (1983)	"My Love" (1983)

Audio
- "You Are" on YouTube

"You Are" is a song released as a single in 1983 by American singer-songwriter Lionel Richie. It was written by Richie and his then-wife, Brenda Harvey Richie. It appears on his self-titled debut solo album, which came out in 1982. It resumes where he left off with D-flat major tunes with Commodores' "Sail On" and "Still", and his solo effort "Truly".

Released as the follow-up single to his number-one hit song "Truly", "You Are" reached the top five on three major Billboard music charts. On the Billboard Hot 100 pop chart, the song spent two weeks at number four in early 1983. It peaked at number two on the R&B chart (behind "Billie Jean" by Michael Jackson), and spent six weeks at number one on the adult contemporary chart. In the United Kingdom, the song reached number 43 on the British pop chart.

Billboard said that it has a faster tempo than "Truly" and that it has "an inventive vocal arrangement, with deft harmonies and resonant bass rumbles."

"You Are" is a romantic song, although it has a more upbeat arrangement than many of Richie's slower ballads, including a horn section. Before achieving popularity for his own music, singer Richard Marx was a studio musician who can be heard singing backing vocals on "You Are" as well as other songs from Richie's debut album.

Richie re-worked the song as a duet with country singer Blake Shelton for Richie's 2012 Tuskegee album.

== Charts ==
=== Weekly charts ===
Chart (1983–2012)	Peak position
Australia (Kent Music Report)	17
UK Singles (OCC)	43
US Billboard Hot 100	4
US Cashbox Top 100	2
US Adult Contemporary (Billboard)	1
US Hot R&B/Hip-Hop Songs (Billboard)	2
Canada Top 50 Singles (RPM)	5

=== Year-end charts ===
Chart (1983)	Position
US Billboard Hot 100	29
US Adult Contemporary (Billboard)	1
US Hot R&B/Hip-Hop Songs (Billboard)	13

== See also ==
- List of number-one adult contemporary singles of 1983 (U.S.)
