= Truly (Lionel Richie song) =

1982 single by Lionel Richie

Single by Lionel Richie

from the album Lionel Richie
- B-side: "Just Put Some Love in Your Heart"
- Released: September 1982
- Recorded: 1982
- Genre: Pop
- Length: 3:26
- Label: Motown
- Songwriter: Lionel Richie
- Producers: Lionel Richie, James Anthony Carmichael

Lionel Richie singles chronology
"Endless Love" (1981)	"Truly" (1982)	"You Are" (1982)

Audio
- "Truly" on YouTube

"Truly" is the debut solo single by American singer-songwriter Lionel Richie. Resuming where he left off with D-flat major tunes "Sail On" and particularly "Still" when he was lead for the Commodores, Richie wrote the song and co-produced it with James Anthony Carmichael.

Released as the first single from his self-titled debut album in 1982, "Truly" debuted on the Billboard Hot 100 on 9 October 1982 and climbed to No. 1 on 27 November – 4 December 1982. It also spent four weeks at No. 1 on the adult contemporary chart, and logged nine weeks at No. 2 on the R&B chart, behind Marvin Gaye's "Sexual Healing". In addition, "Truly" made the top 10 in United Kingdom, where the song peaked at No. 6. The song won a Grammy Award for Richie in the category Best Male Pop Vocal Performance.

Billboard called it a "moving ballad with all the drama and poignance of 'Still', 'Three Times a Lady' and 'Endless Love'."

== Music video ==
In the music video for "Truly", Lionel Richie performs the song live on a piano.

== Track listing ==
- 7" single
1. "Truly"
2. "Just Put Some Love in Your Heart"

== Charts ==
=== Weekly charts ===
Chart (1982–1983)	Peak position
Australia (Kent Music Report)	7
Canada Top Singles (RPM)	1
Canada Adult Contemporary (RPM)	6
Finland (Suomen virallinen lista)	16
Ireland (IRMA)	4
New Zealand (Recorded Music NZ)	21
South Africa (Springbok)	9
UK Singles (Official Charts)	6
US Billboard Hot 100	1
US Adult Contemporary (Billboard)	1
US Hot R&B/Hip-Hop Songs (Billboard)	2

=== Year-end charts ===
Chart (1982)	Position
Canada (RPM)	38

Chart (1983)	Position
Australia (Kent Music Report)	35
US Top Pop Singles (Billboard)	47

== Certifications ==
Region	Certification	Certified units/sales
Canada (Music Canada)	Platinum	100,000^{^}
United Kingdom (BPI)	Silver	250,000^{^}
United States (RIAA)	Gold	1,000,000^{^}
^{^} Shipments figures based on certification alone.

== Steven Houghton version ==
"Truly"

Single by Steven Houghton

from the album Steven Houghton
- Released: 6 March 1998
- Recorded: 1997
- Genre: Pop
- Length: 3:20
- Label: Bertelsmann Music Group
- Songwriter: Lionel Richie
- Producer: Steven Houghton

Steven Houghton singles chronology
"Wind Beneath My Wings" (1997)	"Truly" (1998)

British singer and actor Steven Houghton released a cover version of "Truly" in March 1998 which reached the top 30 of the UK Singles Chart. The song was played in the series 10 finale of London's Burning, in which Houghton starred in.

=== Track listing ===
- CD single
1. "Truly" – 3:20
2. "Wind Beneath My Wings" – 4:30

=== Charts ===
Chart (1998)	Peak position
UK Singles (OCC)	23

== Other cover versions ==
- 2009: Freestyle on their 2009 album Playlist.
- 2013: Richard Poon on his 2013 album Legends.

== See also ==
- List of number-one singles of 1982 (Canada)
- List of Billboard Hot 100 number ones of 1982
- List of Billboard Adult Contemporary number ones of 1982
