= List of Billboard Hot 100 number ones of 1983 =

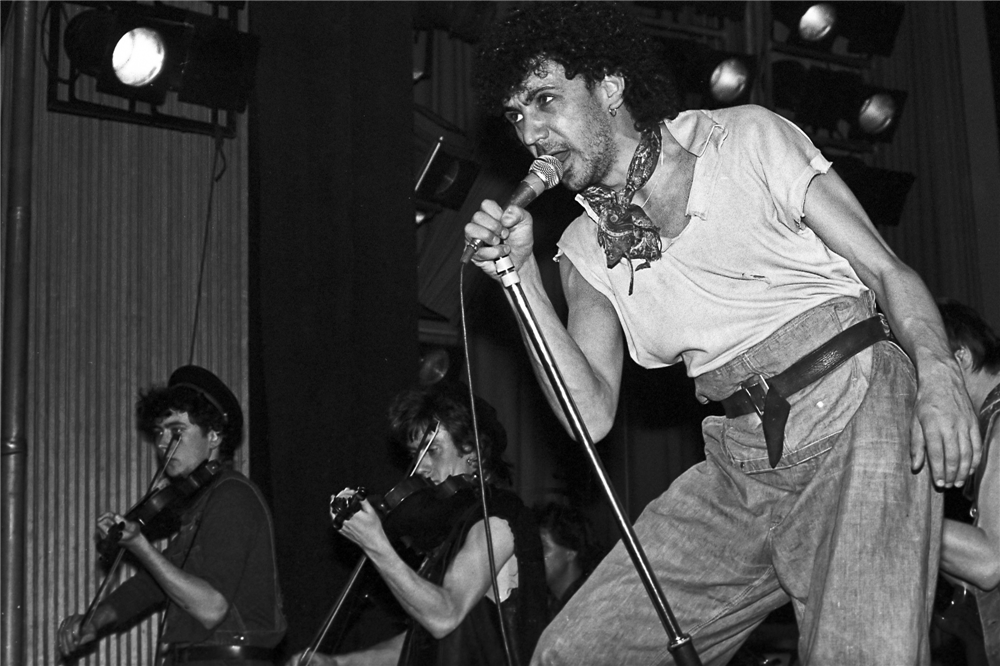
Dexys Midnight Runners were one of a number of British acts with Hot 100 number ones in 1983.

The Billboard Hot 100 is a chart published since August 1958 by Billboard magazine which ranks the best-performing singles in the United States. In 1983, it was compiled based on a combination of sales and airplay data sourced from surveys of retail outlets and playlists submitted by radio stations, respectively. During the year, 17 different singles spent time at number one.

At the start of the year, Daryl Hall & John Oates held the number-one position with "Maneater". It was displaced from the top spot by "Down Under" by Men at Work in the issue of Billboard dated January 15. The latter song spent four non-consecutive weeks atop the Hot 100, the run being interrupted for a single week by "Africa", the debut number one for the band Toto. In February, "Baby, Come to Me" by Patti Austin and James Ingram reached number one, the first chart-topper for either singer. The duet had originally been released early in the previous year and achieved little success; after it was featured on the television soap opera General Hospital, sparking renewed interest in the song, it was re-released and went to number one. After two weeks atop the Hot 100, it was replaced by "Billie Jean", the first of three chart-toppers achieved in 1983 by Michael Jackson. No other act took more than one single to number one during the year. "Billie Jean" spent seven weeks at number one; after one week out of the top spot, Jackson returned to the top of the Hot 100 with "Beat It". Both singles were taken from his album Thriller, one of the best-selling and most critically-acclaimed records of all time.

Between Jackson's first two chart-toppers of 1983, Dexys Midnight Runners spent a single week at number one with "Come On Eileen". It was the only top 40 entry for the British band, which is considered a one-hit wonder in the United States. The band was associated with the so-called Second British Invasion of the United States music scene, which led to British acts dominating the upper reaches of the Hot 100 during 1983. Another British group, the Police, reached number one in the United States for the first time with "Every Breath You Take", which spent eight weeks in the peak position, the year's longest run atop the Hot 100. In one week of its run at number one, seven of the singles in the top ten were by acts from the United Kingdom. Two other British acts, Eurythmics and Bonnie Tyler, gained their first Hot 100 chart-toppers in 1983; Eurythmics had never charted on the Hot 100 before and Tyler's only previous entry had been in 1978. Irene Cara reached the top of the Hot 100 for the first and only time with "Flashdance... What a Feeling" in May and Michael Sembello did the same in September with "Maniac"; both songs were taken from the soundtrack of the film Flashdance. "Flashdance... What a Feeling" won the Academy Award for Best Original Song at the following April's ceremony. The final chart-topper of 1983 was "Say Say Say", a collaboration between Paul McCartney and Michael Jackson. The third number one of the year for Jackson, it reached the top spot on the chart dated December 10 and remained there for the rest of the year.

== Chart history ==
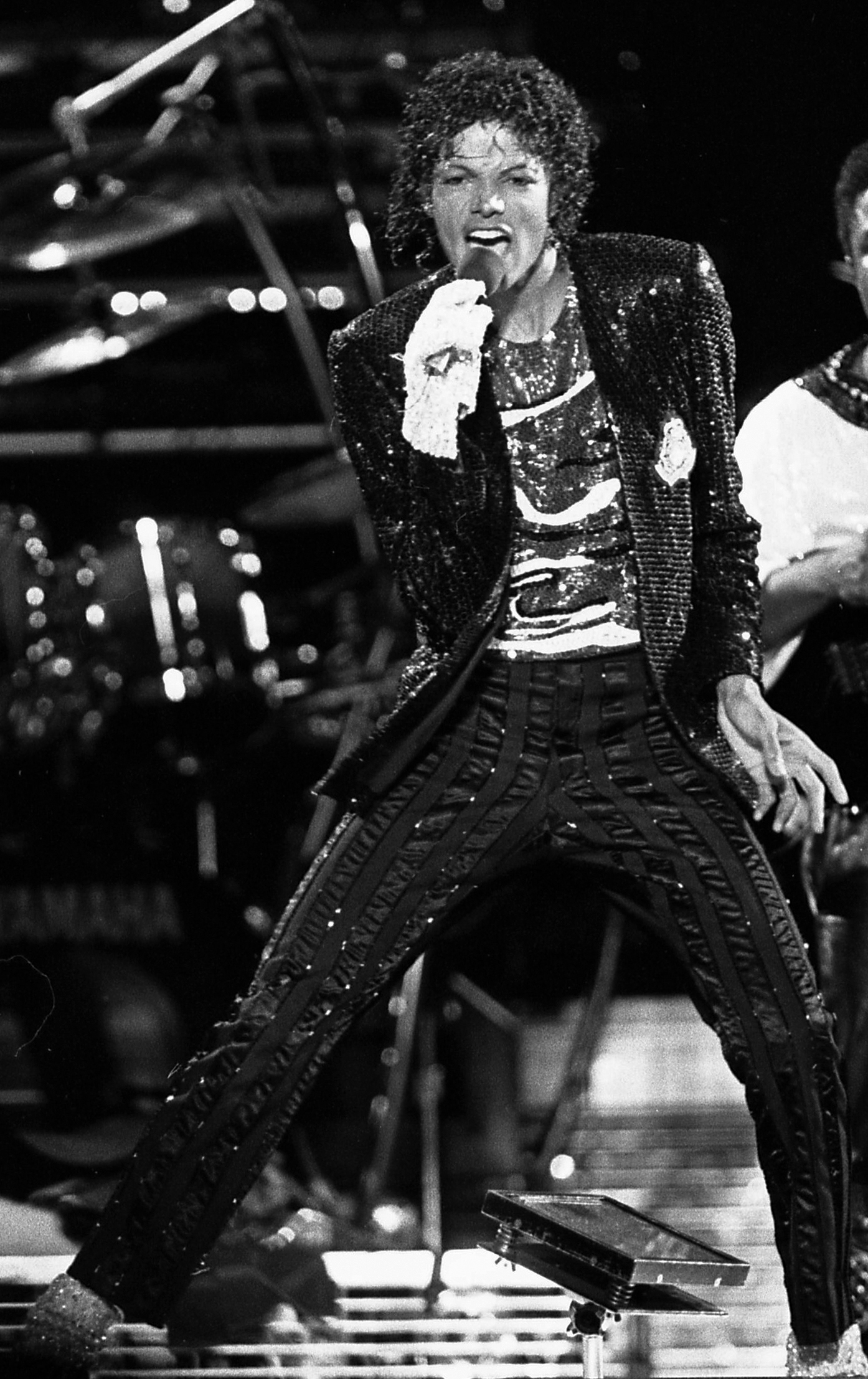
Michael Jackson had the year's most Hot 100 number ones of any act and spent the most weeks in the top spot.

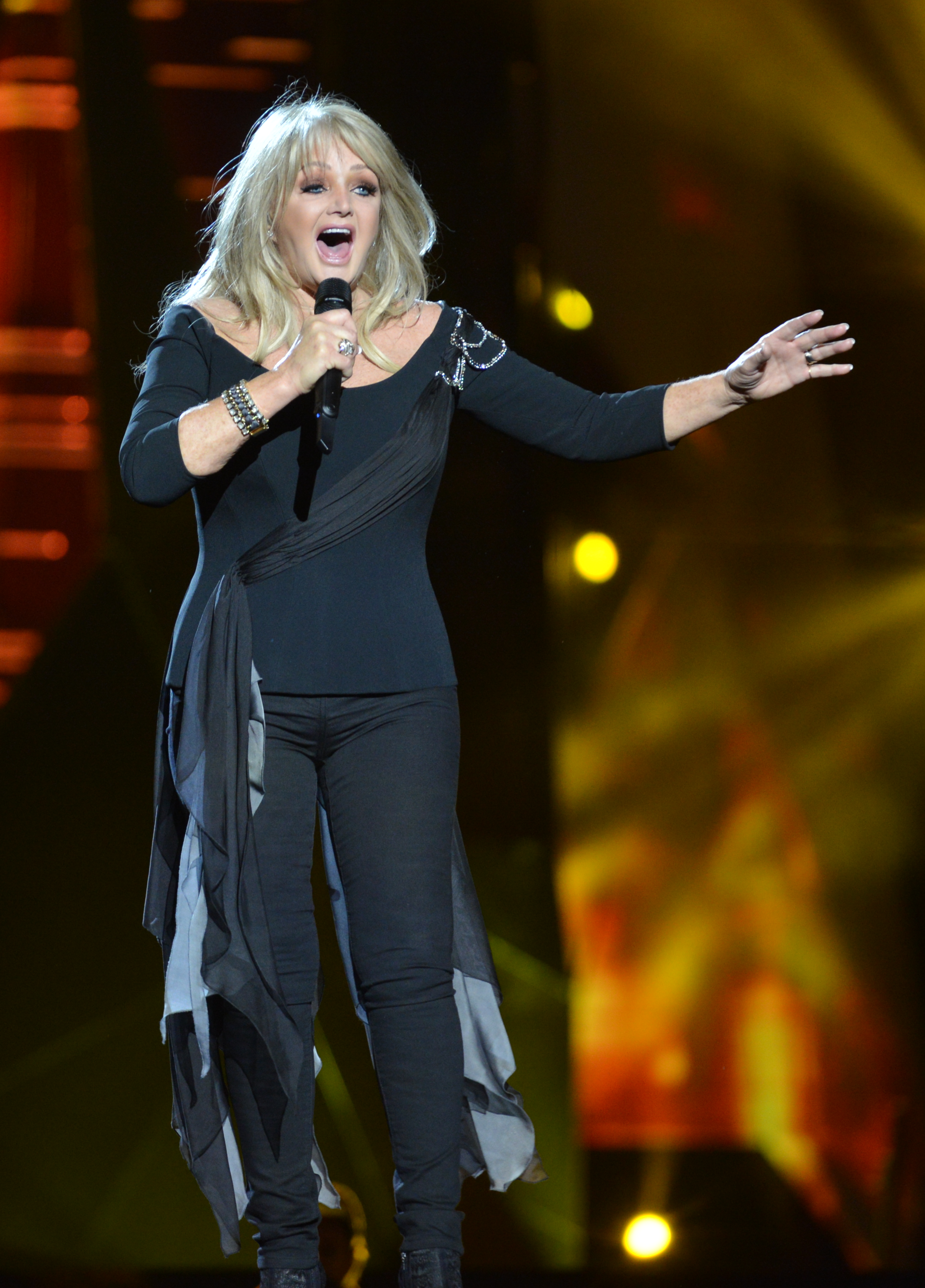
"Total Eclipse of the Heart" was a chart-topper for the Welsh singer Bonnie Tyler (pictured in 2013).

Patti Austin and James Ingram (pictured in 2000 and 1998 respectively) topped the chart with their duet "Baby, Come to Me".

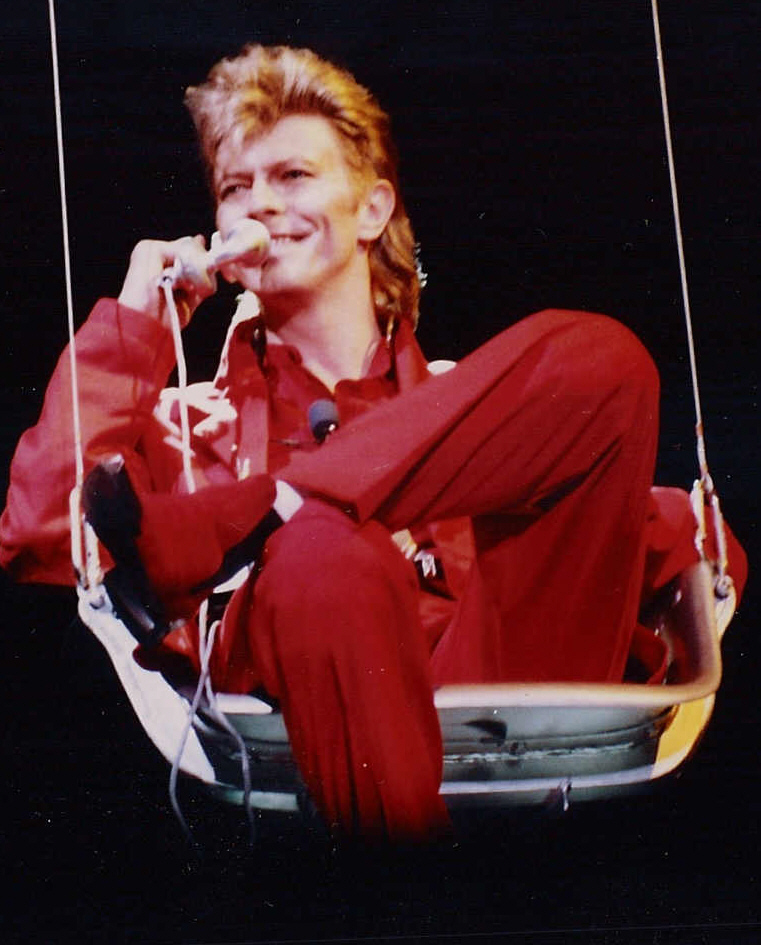
David Bowie topped the chart with "Let's Dance".

Chart history
No. (Note: The "No." column indicates the numerical sequence of number ones in Hot 100 history. "Re" indicates a single returning to number one.)	Issue date	Title	Artist(s)	Ref.
526	January 1 (Note: This was an unpublished week, due to a special double issue that Billboard published in print the previous week. All positions on the Hot 100 were "frozen" during the break.)	"Maneater"	Daryl Hall & John Oates	
526	January 8	"Maneater"	Daryl Hall & John Oates	
527	January 15	"Down Under"	Men at Work	
527	January 22	"Down Under"	Men at Work	
527	January 29	"Down Under"	Men at Work	
528	February 5	"Africa"	Toto	
527 (re)	February 12	"Down Under"	Men at Work	
529	February 19	"Baby, Come to Me"	Patti Austin and James Ingram	
529	February 26	"Baby, Come to Me"	Patti Austin and James Ingram	
530	March 5	"Billie Jean"	Michael Jackson	
530	March 12	"Billie Jean"	Michael Jackson	
530	March 19	"Billie Jean"	Michael Jackson	
530	March 26	"Billie Jean"	Michael Jackson	
530	April 2	"Billie Jean"	Michael Jackson	
530	April 9	"Billie Jean"	Michael Jackson	
530	April 16	"Billie Jean"	Michael Jackson	
531	April 23	"Come On Eileen"	Dexys Midnight Runners	
532	April 30	"Beat It"	Michael Jackson	
532	May 7	"Beat It"	Michael Jackson	
532	May 14	"Beat It"	Michael Jackson	
533	May 21	"Let's Dance"	David Bowie	
534	May 28	"Flashdance... What a Feeling"	Irene Cara	
534	June 4	"Flashdance... What a Feeling"	Irene Cara	
534	June 11	"Flashdance... What a Feeling"	Irene Cara	
534	June 18	"Flashdance... What a Feeling"	Irene Cara	
534	June 25	"Flashdance... What a Feeling"	Irene Cara	
534	July 2	"Flashdance... What a Feeling"	Irene Cara	
535	July 9	"Every Breath You Take"	The Police	
535	July 16	"Every Breath You Take"	The Police	
535	July 23	"Every Breath You Take"	The Police	
535	July 30	"Every Breath You Take"	The Police	
535	August 6	"Every Breath You Take"	The Police	
535	August 13	"Every Breath You Take"	The Police	
535	August 20	"Every Breath You Take"	The Police	
535	August 27	"Every Breath You Take"	The Police	
536	September 3	"Sweet Dreams (Are Made of This)"	Eurythmics	
537	September 10	"Maniac"	Michael Sembello	
537	September 17	"Maniac"	Michael Sembello	
538	September 24	"Tell Her About It"	Billy Joel	
539	October 1	"Total Eclipse of the Heart"	Bonnie Tyler	
539	October 8	"Total Eclipse of the Heart"	Bonnie Tyler	
539	October 15	"Total Eclipse of the Heart"	Bonnie Tyler	
539	October 22	"Total Eclipse of the Heart"	Bonnie Tyler	
540	October 29	"Islands in the Stream"	Kenny Rogers and Dolly Parton	
540	November 5	"Islands in the Stream"	Kenny Rogers and Dolly Parton	
541	November 12	"All Night Long (All Night)"	Lionel Richie	
541	November 19	"All Night Long (All Night)"	Lionel Richie	
541	November 26	"All Night Long (All Night)"	Lionel Richie	
541	December 3	"All Night Long (All Night)"	Lionel Richie	
542	December 10	"Say Say Say"	Paul McCartney and Michael Jackson	
542	December 17	"Say Say Say"	Paul McCartney and Michael Jackson	
542	December 24	"Say Say Say"	Paul McCartney and Michael Jackson	
542	December 31	"Say Say Say"	Paul McCartney and Michael Jackson	

== Number-one artists ==
List of number-one artists by total weeks at number one
Weeks at No. 1	Artist
14	Michael Jackson
8	The Police
6	Irene Cara
4	Men at Work
4	Bonnie Tyler
4	Lionel Richie
4	Paul McCartney
2	Daryl Hall & John Oates
2	Patti Austin
2	James Ingram
2	Michael Sembello
2	Kenny Rogers
2	Dolly Parton
1	Toto
1	Dexys Midnight Runners
1	David Bowie
1	Eurythmics
1	Billy Joel

== See also ==
- 1983 in music
- List of Cash Box Top 100 number-one singles of 1983
- List of Billboard number-one singles
- List of number-one R&B singles of 1983 (U.S.)
- List of Billboard Hot 100 number-one singles of the 1980s
