= The Girl Is Mine =

1982 single by Michael Jackson and Paul McCartney

Single by Michael Jackson and Paul McCartney

from the album Thriller
- B-side: "Can't Get Outta the Rain"
- Released: October 18, 1982
- Recorded: April 14–16, 1982
- Studio: Westlake (Los Angeles, California)
- Genre: Pop; soft rock
- Length: 3:42
- Label: Epic
- Songwriter: Michael Jackson
- Producers: Quincy Jones; Michael Jackson

Michael Jackson singles chronology
"Girlfriend" (1980)	"The Girl Is Mine" (1982)	"Billie Jean" (1983)

Paul McCartney singles chronology
"Tug of War" (1982)	"The Girl Is Mine" (1982)	"Say Say Say" (1983)

Licensed audio
- "The Girl Is Mine" on YouTube

Audio sample
- "The Girl Is Mine": file; help

"The Girl Is Mine" is a song recorded by the American singer-songwriter Michael Jackson and the English singer-songwriter and musician Paul McCartney for Jackson's sixth solo album, Thriller. The track was written and co-produced by Jackson and produced by Quincy Jones. The song was recorded at Westlake Studios, Los Angeles, from April 14 to 16, 1982 and was released on October 18 of that same year as the album's first single. The year before, Jackson and McCartney had recorded "Say Say Say" and "The Man" for the latter's fifth solo album, Pipes of Peace (1983).

"The Girl Is Mine" achieved success in the music charts. Aside from topping the R&B singles chart, the single peaked at number two on the Billboard Hot 100 and number eight in the UK. The song also reached number one in Spain. By 1984, it had sold 1.3 million copies, and was eventually certified Gold by the Recording Industry Association of America, for shipments of 1,000,000 units. Despite the song's success, it received generally mixed reviews from critics who considered it to be the weakest song on Thriller.

"The Girl Is Mine" has been the subject of two plagiarism lawsuits, the first in 1984 and again in 1993. Both instances required Jackson to testify in court, and each lawsuit was decided in favor of the singer and his record label.

In 2008, for the 25th anniversary edition of Thriller, Black Eyed Peas singer will.i.am remixed "The Girl Is Mine" using the original Hayvenhurst solo demo. The remix received generally unfavorable reviews from music critics.

== Recording ==
The writing of "The Girl Is Mine" was completed by Jackson as he watched cartoons with Paul McCartney. Producer Quincy Jones had initially told Jackson to write a song about two men fighting over a girl. Inspired, Jackson awoke during the night and sang the song into a tape recorder. He later said, "I sang exactly what I heard in my head, starting with the melody and the keyboard and the strings and everything. So, I just orally put it all on tape." Jones also asked Jackson to add a rap verse. The song was then recorded by Jackson and McCartney at Westlake Studios, Los Angeles, from April 14 to 16, 1982. A year earlier, the duo had recorded "Say Say Say" and "The Man," which were released after "The Girl Is Mine" on McCartney's fifth solo album, Pipes of Peace (1983).

Jackson said that the recording of "The Girl Is Mine" was one of his most enjoyable moments in the studio. He explained, "One of my favorite songs to record, of all my recordings as a solo artist, is probably 'The Girl Is Mine', because working with Paul McCartney was pretty exciting and we just literally had fun. It was like lots of kibitzing and playing, and throwing stuff at each other, and making jokes. We actually recorded the (instrumental) track and the vocals pretty much live at the same time, and we do have footage of it, but it's never been shown." He concluded, "Maybe one day we'll give you a sneak preview of it." The footage of the pair was later shown at the Paul McCartney World Tour (1989–1990).

Several members of the band Toto participated in the recording of this song, including David Paich (piano), Jeff Porcaro (drums), Steve Lukather (guitars) and Steve Porcaro (synthesizer programming).

== Composition ==
The musical structuring of "The Girl Is Mine" uses the AABA form, in which the song's title serves as the main source of needed repetition. When used to the maximum, this structuring, also known as the thirty-two-bar form, has the title repeat itself in the same place, in at least two of the three A verses. Author Sheila Davis' book, The Craft of Lyric Writing, notes that "the repeated title line simultaneously outlines the framework of the design and drives home the main point of the lyric". Jackson's "She's Out of My Life" also uses this musical structuring, as does "Body and Soul", "Oh, Lady Be Good!" and "Try a Little Tenderness". The musical chords in "The Girl Is Mine" are seen in several songs written by Jackson. "Blues Away", from The Jacksons, and other songs ("Why Can't I Be" and "Thank You for Life") used the chords before "The Girl Is Mine".

== Release and reception ==
"The Girl is Mine" was the first single from the album to be released. The single's cover photograph was taken by McCartney's wife, Linda. Listeners were not impressed by "The Girl Is Mine", and thought that Jackson's Thriller would also be a disappointment. The public felt that Jackson and the producer, Quincy Jones, had created a song for the white pop audience. Despite some of the public's concerns, "The Girl Is Mine" achieved success in the music charts. Topping the R&B singles chart, the single peaked at number two on the Billboard Hot 100 on January 8, 1983 (behind "Maneater" by Hall & Oates and "Down Under" by Men at Work) and the Norwegian Singles Chart. "The Girl Is Mine" began its first of four weeks at number one on the Hot Adult Contemporary Tracks chart beginning December 25, 1982. The song charted at number eight in the UK, peaking within the New Zealand Top 20. By 1985, the single had sold 1.3 million copies. The single was certified gold by the Recording Industry Association of America on January 13, 1983, for shipments of at least one million units.

Since its release, "The Girl Is Mine" has received mixed reviews from journalists and music critics. Journalist Robert Christgau described the pairing of McCartney and Jackson as "Michael's worst idea since 'Ben'". Rolling Stone stated that the song was a "wimpoid MOR [middle of the road] ballad" and that McCartney was "tame". Billboard called it a "breezy lighthearted love song capped by some playful superstar banter at the tag." Stephen Erlewine of AllMusic noted that the song had a "sweet schmaltz". Jackson's breakdown with the "irrepressibly silly Paul McCartney" was "disarmingly goofy", according to Stylus Magazine. Salon.com later described "The Girl Is Mine" as a "sappy duet". They concluded that McCartney had become a "wimpy old fart". The song garnered a favourable review from Jackson's biographer, J. Randy Taraborrelli. The writer stated that the song was "cute" but lacked substance. He added that the track had a "middle-of-the-road calm" and was the antithesis of the "rambunctious" "Beat It".

== Plagiarism lawsuits ==
"The Girl Is Mine" has been the subject of two plagiarism lawsuits. Both instances required Jackson to testify in court, and each lawsuit was decided in favor of the singer and his record label. The first legal trial occurred in 1984, with Fred Sanford claiming that Jackson had cut a tape of his song, "Please Love Me Now". Jackson, however, insisted that he composed "The Girl Is Mine". The $5 million copyright suit was closed after the jury of five men and a woman reached a verdict in favor of Jackson. Their verdict was reached after a three-day deliberation. Jackson was not a defendant in the trial but testified to maintain his credibility. James Klenk, Jackson's attorney, praised the singer upon the jury's verdict. "The man is a genius. He doesn't need anyone else's songs. His own words were the key." During the court proceedings, Jackson revealed how he composes his songs. "I put them in a tape recorder and I orally sing them into the tape, and that's how it happens." One juror stated, "His presentation indicated that he was well able to develop his own songs."

The song's second plagiarism trial was in 1993. Reynaud Jones and Robert Smith alleged that "The Girl Is Mine", along with "Thriller"—written by Rod Temperton—and "We Are the World", resembled their musical works. The pair added that they had been childhood neighbors of the Jackson family when they had resided in Gary, Indiana. Jackson, Lionel Richie—co-writer of "We Are the World"—and Quincy Jones were named as the defendants. The plaintiffs asserted that Joseph Jackson had received a demo tape from them. From the tapes, the defendants were alleged to have stolen the three hit songs. Reynaud Jones also claimed that he had considered suing Jackson over "Billie Jean". Jackson appeared in court via a taped testimony. Following the testimony, the nine-member jury found Jackson to be the writer and composer of "The Girl Is Mine" in early 1994. They also ruled that the defendants had not plagiarized "Thriller" or "We Are the World".

== Personnel ==
- Written and composed by Michael Jackson
- Produced by Quincy Jones & Michael Jackson
- Rhodes piano: Greg Phillinganes
- Acoustic piano: David Paich
- Synthesizer: David Foster
- Synthesizer programming: Steve Porcaro
- Guitar: Dean Parks and Steve Lukather
- Bass guitar: Louis Johnson
- Drums: Jeff Porcaro
- Vocals: Michael Jackson and Paul McCartney
- Vocal arrangement by Michael Jackson and Quincy Jones
- Rhythm arrangement by Quincy Jones and David Paich
- Synthesizer arrangement by David Foster
- Strings arranged and conducted by Jerry Hey
- Concertmaster: Jerry Vinci

== Charts ==
=== Weekly charts ===
Weekly chart performance for "The Girl Is Mine"
Chart (1982–1983)	Peak position
Australia (Kent Music Report)	4
Canada (RPM)	8
Dutch Singles Chart	16
Finland (Suomen virallinen singlelista)	6
Irish Singles Chart	4
Italy (Musica e Dischi)	22
Japan (Oricon)	37
New Zealand	3
Norwegian Singles Chart	1
South Africa (Springbok)	5
Spain	1
UK Singles (OCC)	8
US Adult Contemporary Chart	1
US Billboard Hot 100	2
US Cashbox	3
US R&B Singles Chart	1
US Radio & Records CHR/Pop Airplay Chart	4

=== Year-end charts ===
Year-end chart performance for "The Girl Is Mine"
Chart (1982/1983)	Position
Canada RPM	61
US Top Pop Singles (Billboard)	49
Billboard Adult Contemporary number ones of 1983 (Billboard)	9

== Certifications ==
Certifications for "The Girl Is Mine"
Region	Certification	Certified units/sales
Canada (Music Canada)	Gold	40,000^{‡}
Mexico (AMPROFON)	Gold	30,000^{‡}
New Zealand (RMNZ)	Platinum	30,000^{‡}
United Kingdom (BPI)	Silver	200,000^{‡}
United States (RIAA)	Platinum	1,300,000
^{‡} Sales+streaming figures based on certification alone.

== The Girl Is Mine 2008 ==
"The Girl Is Mine 2008"

Single by Michael Jackson with will.i.am

from the album Thriller 25
- Released: January 14, 2008
- Recorded: November 2007
- Genre: Pop; hip hop
- Length: 3:11
- Label: Epic; Legacy
- Songwriters: Michael Jackson; William Adams; Keith Harris
- Producers: Michael Jackson; will.i.am

Michael Jackson singles chronology
"One More Chance" (2003)	"The Girl Is Mine 2008" (2008)	"Wanna Be Startin' Somethin' 2008" (2008)

will.i.am singles chronology
"I Want You" (2007)	"The Girl Is Mine 2008 with will.i.am" (2008)	"Heartbreaker" (2008)

For Thriller 25, an album celebrating Thriller's 25th anniversary, Black Eyed Peas singer will.i.am remixed "The Girl Is Mine". Entitled "The Girl Is Mine 2008", the remix features an original solo demo of the song by Jackson without McCartney. will.i.am added his own vocals and new verse. The song reached number 12 in New Zealand, 22 in France, in the top 50 of Denmark and Sweden, and number 51 in Switzerland.

Though the remix sampled the demo, The Daily Telegraph alleged that McCartney was omitted because he and Jackson had fallen out over Jackson's purchase of Sony/ATV Music Publishing and the Beatles' song catalogue in 1985. However, the original version of "The Girl Is Mine" was included on Thriller 25 with McCartney's vocals included.

=== Reception ===
"The Girl Is Mine 2008" received mostly unfavorable reviews. Journalist Christopher Rees stated that will.i.am had "done a fantastic job of murdering a classic song". Rob Sheffield of Rolling Stone wrote that at will.i.am's production was "dumb-thug bluster" and criticized him for trying to hide the "goofy 'doggone' hook"—"the whole point of the song". Music journalist Aidin Vaziri wrote that will.i.am "completely erases Paul McCartney's vocal track from the original duet to make room for himself spouting nonsense". Stephen Thomas Erlewine of AllMusic claimed that will.i.am had turned "The Girl Is Mine" into a "hapless dance number". Kelefa Sanneh of Blender wrote that "will.i.am contributes beats (why?) and rhymes (why, oh, why?) to 'The Girl Is Mine 2008'". IGN's Todd Gilchrist stated that will.i.am's "The Girl Is Mine" remix was an offense. The offense was made even more "egregious" by the insertion of his own "atonal vocal presence" in place of McCartney's.

Pitchfork Media added to the unfavorable reviews, stating of will.i.am, "He takes Macca off 'The Girl Is Mine' but decides it can't work without someone sounding like an idiot and steps manfully in himself." The Times stated that whoever thought it was a good idea for will.i.am to participate in the song ought to be "locked in a windowless cell with nothing but those songs on a continuous loop". PopMatters, however, praised Thriller 25 and the remix of "The Girl Is Mine". They wrote, "Any album good enough to make you forgive (although maybe not forget) a song as bad as the Paul McCartney duet 'The Girl Is Mine' has got to be damn good." They added that will.i.am had put a "breezy spin" on the track and that the song's omission of McCartney did not suffer because of it.

=== Track listing ===
- CD single
1. "The Girl Is Mine 2008 with will.i.am" – 3:10
2. "The Girl Is Mine 2008 Club Mix with will.i.am" – 3:25
3. "The Girl Is Mine" (original demo recording) – 3:13

=== Remix credits ===
- Written by Michael Jackson, William "will.i.am" Adams, Keith Harris
- Produced by William "will.i.am" Adams
- Engineered by William "will.i.am" Adams
- Mixed by William "will.i.am" Adams, Joe Solo
- Drum programming: William "will.i.am" Adams
- Keyboards: William "will.i.am" Adams, Keith Harris
- Synthesizers: Keith Harris
- Recorded in November 2007

=== Charts ===
Chart performance for "The Girl Is Mine 2008"
Chart (2008)	Peak position
Australia (ARIA)	60
Austria (Ö3 Austria Top 40)	51
Denmark (Tracklisten)	31
France (SNEP)	22
Netherlands (Single Top 100)	12
Sweden (Sverigetopplistan)	41
Switzerland (Schweizer Hitparade)	47
UK Singles (OCC)	32

=== Certifications ===
Certifications for "The Girl Is Mine 2008"
Region	Certification	Certified units/sales
Denmark (IFPI Danmark)	Gold	45,000^{‡}
^{‡} Sales+streaming figures based on certification alone.

== See also ==
- List of number-one adult contemporary singles of 1982 (U.S.)
- List of number-one adult contemporary singles of 1983 (U.S.)
- "Just Good Friends" – a 1987 song by Michael Jackson and Stevie Wonder with similar subject matter
- "The Boy Is Mine" – a 1998 song by Brandy and Monica, with a similar theme but about two girls fighting over a boy

== Bibliography ==
- Campbell, Lisa (1995). Michael Jackson: The King of Pop's Darkest Hour. Branden. ISBN 0-8283-2003-9.
- Davis, Sheila (1985). The Craft of Lyric Writing. Writer's Digest Books. ISBN 0-89879-149-9.
- George, Nelson (2004). Michael Jackson: The Ultimate Collection booklet. Sony BMG.
- Halstead, Craig (2007). Michael Jackson: For the Record. Authors OnLine. ISBN 978-0-7552-0267-6.
- Taraborrelli, J. Randy (2004). The Magic and the Madness. Terra Alta, WV: Headline. ISBN 0-330-42005-4.
