= Baby, Come to Me (Patti Austin and James Ingram song) =

- A-side label of US vinyl single

Single by Patti Austin and James Ingram

from the album Every Home Should Have One
- B-side: "Solero"
- Released: April 1982; October 1982 (re-released)
- Recorded: 1981
- Genre: R&B; quiet storm
- Length: 3:31 (7" single); 3:45 (LP version)
- Label: Qwest
- Songwriter: Rod Temperton
- Producer: Quincy Jones

Patti Austin singles chronology
"Every Home Should Have One" (1982)	"Baby, Come to Me" (1982)	"How Do You Keep the Music Playing?" (1983)

James Ingram singles chronology
"One Hundred Ways" (1981)	"Baby, Come to Me" (1982)	"How Do You Keep the Music Playing?" (1983)

"Baby, Come to Me", a love ballad from Patti Austin's 1981 album Every Home Should Have One, was her duet with James Ingram. It was written by Rod Temperton (formerly of Heatwave). The song was released as a single in April 1982, initially peaking at No. 73 on the US Billboard Hot 100. Several months later, American soap opera General Hospital began to feature the song heavily as the love theme for character Luke Spencer. It was re-released in October of that same year and reached No. 1 on the US chart in February 1983.

== History ==
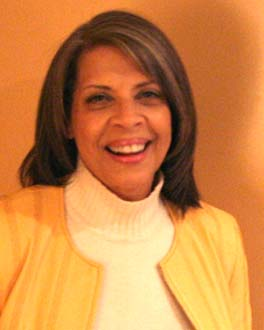
Patti Austin

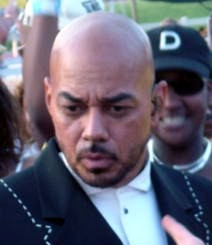
James Ingram

The song was performed by Patti Austin and James Ingram, with Michael McDonald contributing background vocals. Produced by Quincy Jones, the song appears on Austin's 1981 album, Every Home Should Have One. When first released as a single, it charted on the US Billboard Hot 100 for just four weeks, peaking at number 73 on 8 May 1982.

Later that year, it gained new exposure as the romantic theme song for Luke Spencer, a leading character on the ABC soap opera General Hospital. ABC received so many inquiries about the song that Warner Bros. decided to re-release "Baby, Come to Me" as a single. On 16 October 1982, the song re-entered the Billboard Hot 100. It reached No. 1 on 19 February 1983, where it stayed for two weeks, and spent seven months on the Hot 100. It also hit No. 1 on the Adult Contemporary chart in early 1983 and reached No. 11 in the UK in March 1983.

== Personnel ==
- Lead and Backing Vocals: James Ingram
- Lead and Backing Vocals: Patti Austin
- Backing vocals: Michael McDonald
- Drums: John Robinson
- Bass: Eddie Watkins Jr.
- Guitar: Steve Lukather
- Keyboards: Greg Phillinganes
- Fender Rhodes: Richard Tee
- Synthesizers: Greg Phillinganes, David Foster, Michael Boddicker, Rod Temperton
- Percussion: Paulinho Da Costa
- Arrangement: Rod Temperton
- Recording engineer: Bruce Swedien
- Mixing: Bruce Swedien
- Mastering: Bernie Grundman

== Covers ==
Among artists who have covered the song are:

- Shirley Bassey
- Dalida
- Laura Fygi
- Daryl Hall and Kenny G
- Alexander O'Neal and Cherrelle
- Stephanie Winslow
- Eliane Elias (Love Stories, 2019)

== Charts ==
=== Weekly charts ===
Chart (1982–1983)	Peak position
Australia	38
Belgium (Ultratop 50 Flanders)	10
Canada RPM Top Singles	3
Canada RPM Adult Contemporary	20
Netherlands (Dutch Top 40)	5
Netherlands (Single Top 100)	9
Ireland (IRMA)	6
New Zealand (Recorded Music NZ)	9
Sweden (Sverigetopplistan)	11
UK Singles (Official Charts)	11
US Billboard Hot 100	1
US Adult Contemporary (Billboard)	1
US Hot R&B/Hip-Hop Songs (Billboard)	9
US Cash Box Top 100	2

=== Year-end charts ===
Chart (1983)	Position
Australia	136
Canada	26
Netherlands (Dutch Top 40)	91
Netherlands (Single Top 100)	77
US Billboard Hot 100	8
US Adult Contemporary (Billboard)	6
US Hot R&B/Hip-Hop Songs (Billboard)	11

== Certifications ==
Region	Certification	Certified units/sales
United States (RIAA)	Gold	1,000,000^{^}
^{^} Shipments figures based on certification alone.

== See also ==
- List of Billboard Hot 100 number-one singles of 1983
- List of number-one adult contemporary singles of 1983 (U.S.)
- Rise (instrumental), another song popularised by connection with Luke Spencer on General Hospital
