= The Last Unicorn (disambiguation) =

The Last Unicorn is a fantasy novel written by Peter S. Beagle.

The Last Unicorn may also refer to:

- The Last Unicorn (film), a 1982 American animated fantasy film based on the novel
  - The Last Unicorn (album), a 1983 soundtrack album by Jimmy Webb
  - "The Last Unicorn" (song), title theme from the movie recorded by America
- The Last Unicorn: The Lost Version, a version of the original manuscript of the novel
- The Last Unicorn (EP), an EP by Swirl
