= You Can Do Magic =

You Can Do Magic may refer to the following:

- "You Can Do Magic" (song), a 1982 song by America
- "You Can Do Magic", a 1973 song by Limmie & Family Cookin'
- You Can Do Magic (album), a 1996 compilation album by America
