= Alibi (America album) =

Studio album by America
- Released: August 15, 1980
- Recorded: 1980
- Genre: Pop rock; soft rock
- Length: 37:30
- Label: Capitol
- Producer: Matthew McCauley; Fred Mollin

America chronology
Silent Letter (1979)	Alibi (1980)	View from the Ground (1982)

Alibi is the ninth studio album by American folk rock duo America, released by Capitol Records in 1980.

== History ==
Prior to their second album on Capitol, Bunnell and Beckley amicably parted ways with George Martin in an effort to try a new musical direction. For the new album, the group utilized two producers—Matthew McCauley and Fred Mollin. While Silent Letter was recorded by Bunnell, Beckley and their backing band (Willie Leacox, Michael Woods, David Dickey and Jim Calire), Alibi was a virtual roll-call of the burgeoning West Coast music scene. The recording included musicians such as Timothy B. Schmit, Waddy Wachtel, Mike Baird, Lee Sklar, Richard Page, Norton Buffalo and Steve Lukather.

Alibi, released in August 1980, was the second America album not to feature a picture of the band members on the cover. (The first was a Kauai sunset photo on Harbor, where the album was recorded.) Instead, the cover sported a picture of a doll's head in the foreground of a desert landscape. Dewey Bunnell said he chose the picture while looking through the archives of photographer Henry Diltz. The album was also unusual in the era of vinyl primacy in that it did not have numbered sides. Because the group and Capitol disagreed on which side would be side one, they agreed on a compromise: the sides would be labelled "Our side" and "Their side".

The album peaked at only number 142 on the Billboard album chart in the US. The first single from the album, "You Could've Been the One", was a commercial failure in the US, failing to chart on Billboard and reaching only 114 on the Record World singles chart. The second single, "Hangover", failed to chart. After the band took part, as special guest, at the Sanremo Music Festival in 1982, "Survival" and the album became hits in Italy, with the song making the top 5 and the album peaking at number 2.

Although Alibi was yet another commercial disappointment for America, the band's fortunes would dramatically improve with their next album, View from the Ground (1982), which included the top ten hit, "You Can Do Magic".

McCauley would later produce several tracks on America's Perspective album in 1984, while Mollin returned in 2011 to produce America's cover album, Back Pages.

== Reception ==
Professional ratings
Review scores
Source	Rating
AllMusic	2.5/5 stars
The Rolling Stone Album Guide	1/5 stars

In his AllMusic retrospective review, music critic Steven Thomas Erlewine summarized that, "essentially, the album picks up where Silent Letter left off, meaning that it's a set of pleasant soft pop, but it's slicker and slighter than its predecessor." He criticized the album's uneven content and thin production, holding up its successor, View from the Ground, as a superior work in the same vein.

== Track listing ==
=== Our side (side one) ===
No.	Title	Writer(s)	Length
1.	"Survival"	Gerry Beckley	3:16
2.	"Might Be Your Love"	Dewey Bunnell	3:46
3.	"Catch that Train"	Beckley, Bunnell	3:03
4.	"You Could've Been the One"	John Batdorf, Sue Sheridan	3:08
5.	"I Don't Believe in Miracles"	Russ Ballard	3:23

=== Their side (side two) ===
No.	Title	Writer(s)	Length
1.	"I Do Believe in You"	Steve George, John Lang, Jerry Manfredi, Richard Page	3:45
2.	"Hangover"	Bunnell	3:41
3.	"Right Back to Me"	Beckley	3:30
4.	"Coastline"	Beckley	3:26
5.	"Valentine"	Bunnell	3:35
6.	"One in a Million"	Beckley	2:52

== Personnel ==
America

- Dewey Bunnell – guitar, vocals
- Gerry Beckley – guitar, keyboards, vocals

with:

- Steve Lukather – guitar
- Fred Mollin – guitar, percussion, background vocals
- Dean Parks – guitar
- Waddy Wachtel – guitar
- Matthew McCauley – synthesizer, background vocals
- James Newton Howard – keyboards, synthesizer
- Jai Winding – keyboards, synthesizer
- Norton Buffalo – harmonica
- Leland Sklar – bass guitar
- Michael Baird – drums
- Willie Leacox – percussion
- JD Souther – background vocals
- Tom Kelly – background vocals
- Richard Page – background vocals
- Timothy B. Schmit – background vocals

== Charts ==
Weekly chart performance for Alibi
Chart (1980, 1982)	Peak position
Italian Albums (Musica e Dischi)	2
US Billboard 200	142

Annual chart rankings for Alibi
Chart (1982)	Rank
Italian Albums (Musica e Dischi)	12
