= In Concert (1995 America album) =

In Concert (King Biscuit)

Live album by America
- Released: July 1995
- Recorded: September 4, 1982
- Venue: Blossom Music Center (Cuyahoga Falls, Ohio)
- Genre: Pop rock
- Label: King Biscuit
- Producer: Gary Lyons

America chronology
Hourglass (1994)	In Concert (King Biscuit) (1995)	Horse with No Name (1995)

Professional ratings
Review scores
Source	Rating
AllMusic	3/5 stars
Rolling Stone Album Guide	1/5 stars

In Concert is the third officially released live album by American folk rock duo America, released by King Biscuit Records in 1995. The concert itself was recorded on September 4, 1982, at the Blossom Music Center in Cuyahoga Falls, Ohio, for an installment of the King Biscuit Flower Hour radio show.

King Biscuit has released this concert in at least four different packages since it first came on the market in 1995 (see "Alternative cover art"). In 2000, a 10 song cut-down version was released with the title "Live". The 2003 edition was titled Greatest Hits Live.

Though it shares the same title, In Concert has no content in common with America's 1985 In Concert album.

== Track listing ==
1. "Tin Man" (Dewey Bunnell) (3:48)
2. "Old Man Took" (Bunnell) (3:41)
3. "Daisy Jane" (Gerry Beckley) (2:55)
4. "Love on the Vine" (Bill Mumy, Bunnell, Robert Haimer) (2:55)
5. "Ventura Highway" (Bunnell) (3:44)
6. "I Need You" (Beckley) (2:32)
7. "Inspector Mills" (Beckley) (4:35)
8. "California Dreamin'" (John Phillips, Michelle Phillips) (3:19)
9. "Never Be Lonely" (3:58)
10. "You Can Do Magic" (Russ Ballard) (3:45)
11. "Sandman" (Bunnell) (5:11)
12. "Here" (Beckley) (6:49)
13. "Sister Golden Hair" (Beckley) (4:00)
14. "A Horse with No Name" (Bunnell) (3:56)

== Alternative cover art ==
1995 Original Version

1995 Alternative Version

1999 Version

2003 Version
as Greatest Hits Live
