= The Last Unicorn (album) =

Film score by Jimmy Webb, America and London Symphony Orchestra
- Released: 19 November 1982
- Recorded: 1982
- Genre: Soundtrack
- Length: 38:19
- Label: Virgin
- Producer: Jimmy Webb

America chronology
View from the Ground (1982)	The Last Unicorn (1982)	Your Move (1983)

The Last Unicorn is a 1982 soundtrack album composed and arranged by Jimmy Webb and performed by America with the London Symphony Orchestra. The album contains the film score for the 1982 film The Last Unicorn, based on the novel of the same name by Peter S. Beagle. The title track got some airplay in Germany, where it was in the Top 100 hit for seven weeks, peaking at number 38.

== Production ==
The Last Unicorn soundtrack was recorded at De Lane Lea Studios in Wembley, England in 1982. It was released in Germany in 1982 by Virgin Records, but has not been released in the United States; it includes the film score's symphonic pieces. Studio singer Katie Irving is the singing voice in the film for Mia Farrow, though Jeff Bridges does his own singing.

== Composition ==
The title song is performed jointly by America and the London Symphony Orchestra, and plays in the film's opening credits against scenes based on The Unicorn Tapestries. The song serves as a leitmotif for other portions of the film score.

== Critical reception ==
In his review for AllMusic, James Christopher Monger gave the album 4/5 stars, writing:

"The score itself, an appropriately somber and sentimental blend of fairy tale motifs and dark, Wagnerian cues, reflects the story's achingly beautiful tale of a unicorn who attempts to overthrow a maniacal king determined to rid the world of the magical creatures, while the songs are far more creative, daring, and eloquent than all of the cookie-cutter balladry that would eventually replace their type in future animated films. Like Watership Down, The Hobbit, and even Robert Altman's live action, Harry Nilsson-scored Popeye, this hard to find soundtrack is a gem from another age."

— James Christopher Monger

Kyle Anderson of the website Nerdist wrote that Jimmy Webb and America were among the "many great people [who] were involved" with the 1982 film, and that the album's "songs work pretty well".

Singer Dan Avidan has stated on numerous occasions that the story was his favorite as a child.

== Track listing ==
All tracks are written by Jimmy Webb

No.	Title	Performer(s)	Length
1.	"The Last Unicorn"	America
2.	"Man's Road"	America
3.	"In the Sea"	America
4.	"Now That I'm a Woman"	Katie Irving
5.	"That's All I've Got to Say"	Jeff Bridges & Katie Irving
6.	"The Last Unicorn Part 2"	America
7.	"Forest Awakens"
8.	"Red Soup"
9.	"Red Bull Attacks"
10.	"The Cat"
11.	"The Tree"
12.	"Haggard's Unicorns"
13.	"Bull-Unicorn-Woman"
14.	"Unicorns in the Sea"
15.	"Unicorn and Lír"

== Personnel ==
- Jimmy Webb – producer, arranger, composer
- Skip Mosher – arranger, composer (Credited as Skip Moser)
- London Symphony Orchestra – orchestra
- Dewey Bunnell – lead vocals (2), rhythm guitar, backing vocals
- Gerry Beckley – lead vocals (1, 3, 6, 15), piano, backing vocals
- Michael Woods – lead guitar, backing vocals
- Brad Palmer – bass, backing vocals
- Willie Leacox – drums, percussion
- Katie Irving – vocals (4, 5)
- Jeff Bridges – vocals (5)

== Covers ==
- "That's All I've Got To Say" was covered in 1981 on Art Garfunkel's fifth solo studio album, Scissors Cut.
- "The Last Unicorn" was covered in 1994 by Kenny Loggins on his album Return to Pooh Corner.
- The band Groove Coverage released an dance version of "The Last Unicorn" on their album Covergirl in 2002.
- Prince Poppycock released a cover of "The Last Unicorn" in 2010.
- In 2015, Ninja Sex Party covered "The Last Unicorn" to promote a U.S. screening tour for the film hosted by the book's author Peter S. Beagle, later releasing it on their album Under the Covers.
- Leighton Meester and Scott Grimes covered "That's All I've Got To Say" in an episode of The Orville.
  - Grimes covered the song again in a later episode.
