= Your Move =

Studio album by America
- Released: June 3, 1983
- Recorded: 1983
- Studio: Abbey Road Studios (London, England); Criteria Studios (Miami, Florida).
- Genre: Soft rock, Pop rock
- Length: 41:07
- Label: Capitol
- Producer: Russ Ballard

America chronology
The Last Unicorn (1982)	Your Move (1983)	Perspective (1984)

Your Move is the eleventh studio album by American folk rock duo America, released by Capitol Records on June 3, 1983.

== History ==
In 1982, America experienced renewed commercial success with the hit album View From The Ground. Two of the tracks on that album, including the Top 10 single "You Can Do Magic," were written and produced by Russ Ballard. Desiring to maintain their commercial momentum, Gerry Beckley and Dewey Bunnell turned to Ballard once again, this time to produce their entire follow-up album.

Beckley and Bunnell began work on the new album by trading songs with Ballard. The recording sessions, however, did not end up as planned. Beckley recalls:

"We thought we were involved in the process, but [when] we got over to London, [Ballard] had cut a lot of the songs that we had mixed, and it became apparent that it was going to be a kind of 75/25 thing, where most of the songs were going to be his. So we were very removed from this album. We did our best to sing these songs as good as we could, but even on the songs we wrote, he basically played all the instruments."

This time around, it was America's input with Ballard that led to a hit single. One of the songs written by Ballard, called "The Border", had potential, but Bunnell was dissatisfied with its lyrics. "Because he was very British, [Ballard] had used some cliche lyrics that, to us as Americans, sounded incongruous," Bunnell remembered. "He was trying to get a desperado-type feel but used words like Pasadena. The lyrics just didn't get the whole border thing and that Mexicali feel that he was envisioning. I asked to rewrite it, and he was receptive, so I wrote a story about running away and trying to escape something."

The album included a number of Ballard-penned ballads, including "She's A Runaway," "Tonight Is For Dreamers," "Honey," and "Don't Let Me Be Lonely," along with the upbeat "My Kinda Woman." "Cast The Spirit," which had originally appeared on Ballard's 1978 album At The Third Stroke, was a more hard-edged entry. Bearing lead vocals by Bunnell, it became the album's second single, but failed to make a dent in the charts.

Bunnell's sole composition for the album was the psychedelic-tinged "My Dear." The album ended with "Someday Woman," an acoustic-driven track written by Beckley, Bill Mumy, and Robert Haimer.

The album contains the cover version of the song "Your Move" which was originally sung by Doug Parkinson.

Your Move was first issued in the CD format in the United States by the now-defunct One Way Records in 1998.

== Album cover ==
The album cover features both band members playing chinese checkers near the ocean.

== Reception ==
Professional ratings
Review scores
Source	Rating
AllMusic	1.5/5 stars
The Rolling Stone Album Guide	1/5 stars

The album was released in June 1983. "The Border", featuring Bunnell's reworked lyrics, strings by the Royal Philharmonic Orchestra and an energetic saxophone solo by Raphael Ravenscroft, hit number 33 on the Billboard singles chart - what would turn out to be America's last Top 40 pop hit to date. The single fared far better on adult contemporary radio, peaking at number 4. This even bettered "You Can Do Magic," which had peaked at number 5 on the adult contemporary charts the year before. However, lacking a major hit single, Your Move was unable to replicate the success of View From The Ground, peaking at number 81 on the Billboard album charts. With that, America's collaboration with Ballard came to an end.

Allmusic's retrospective review panned the album, asserting that it follows the trends of 1983 pop radio but fails to show any inspiration. They singled out "The Border" as the one strong piece on the album, concluding "There's a distinct lack of spark in the material, production, and performance".

The song "Love's Worn Out Again" was a hit in the Philippines in the '80s and remains to be one of the known America songs in the country to this date.

== Track listing ==
All tracks are written by Russ Ballard, except where noted.

No.	Title	Writer(s)	Length
1.	"My Kinda Woman"		3:08
2.	"She's a Runaway"		4:11
3.	"Cast the Spirit"		4:06
4.	"Love's Worn Out Again"	Gerry Beckley, Bill Mumy	3:35
5.	"The Border"	Ballard, Dewey Bunnell	3:59
6.	"Your Move"	Terry Shaddick, Steve Kipner	3:19
7.	"Honey"		3:48
8.	"My Dear"	Dewey Bunnell	4:23
9.	"Tonight Is for Dreamers"		3:20
10.	"Don't Let Me Be Lonely"		3:23
11.	"Someday Woman"	Beckley, Mumy, Robert Haimer	3:51

== Personnel ==
America

- Gerry Beckley – lead vocals, backing vocals
- Dewey Bunnell – lead vocals, backing vocals

Additional musicians

- Russ Ballard – keyboards, guitars, bass, drums, percussion, backing vocals
- Raphael Ravenscroft – saxophones
- The Royal Philharmonic Orchestra – strings
- Louis Clark – string arrangements and conductor
- Barry Griffiths – orchestra leader
- Bill Linnane – piano
- Stephen Bishop – backing vocals (2)

== Production ==
- Russ Ballard – producer
- John Stanley – executive producer
- Dennis Hertzendorfer – engineer
- Patrice Carroll – assistant engineer
- Danny Dawson – assistant engineer
- Ian Grimble – assistant engineer
- Mike Fuller – mastering
- Roy Kohara – art direction
- Hy Fujita – design
- Henry Diltz – cover photography, calligraphy
- Mike Hashimoto – liner photography
- Katz-Gallin-Morey – management

== Charts ==
Chart (1983)	Peak position
US	81
