= Perspective (America album) =

Studio album by America
- Released: September 21, 1984
- Recorded: 1984
- Genre: Soft rock
- Length: 38:38
- Label: Capitol
- Producers: Matthew McCauley, Richie Zito, Richard James Burgess

America chronology
Your Move (1983)	Perspective (1984)	In Concert (1985)

Perspective is the twelfth studio album by American folk rock duo America, released by Capitol Records on September 21, 1984.

== History ==
After several years of failed albums and singles, America returned to the top ten in 1982 with their Russ Ballard-penned single, "You Can Do Magic". In an effort to recreate this success, America had Ballard produce their 1983 album, Your Move. The results of that collaboration, however, were not altogether successful on an artistic or a commercial level. On America's next album, Perspective, the group went in a radically different direction.

The album, featuring three different producers — Matthew McCauley, Richie Zito and Richard James Burgess — and a multitude of prominent session musicians, represented America's foray into the synthesizer-laden music popular in the mid-1980s, including the use of DMX Drums. Band members Gerry Beckley and Dewey Bunnell were credited as executive producers on the project. It reached #185 on the Billboard pop album charts in November 1984, and was the last America album to make the charts until The Complete Greatest Hits did so in 2001. It was America's last studio album for Capitol Records, the last full-length studio album from the group until Hourglass was released in 1994, and the group's last major-label studio album until Here & Now in 2007.

Perspective contains two minor hit singles, "Special Girl" and "Can't Fall Asleep to a Lullabye". "Special Girl", with lead vocals by Beckley, reached number 106 on Billboard's Bubbling Under and number 15 on its adult contemporary charts in October 1984. "Can't Fall Asleep to a Lullaby" (misspelled as "Lullabye" on the album cover) features lead vocals by Bunnell and backing vocals by Steve Perry of Journey. It reached number 26 on the Billboard adult contemporary charts in January 1985. Perry returned the favor by featuring Bunnell in a brief cameo appearance in the video for his 1984 hit single, "Oh Sherrie".

The album also features "Stereo", a collaboration between Beckley and songwriter Jimmy Webb, and the reggae-influenced "Lady with a Bluebird", co-written by Bunnell, Bill Mumy and Robert Haimer. Mumy and Haimer (known for their novelty recording act, Barnes & Barnes) also shared writing credits on "(Can't Fall Asleep to A) Lullaby" with Bunnell and Perry. Timothy B. Schmit (of Poco and the Eagles) provided backing vocals on "Cinderella".

Perspective was recorded, engineered and mixed in a number of locations around Los Angeles, including at Amigo Studios in North Hollywood, Oasis Recording Studio in Universal City, United Western Studios in Hollywood and Larrabee Sound in West Hollywood.

The front cover of the album shows Beckley and Bunnel standing in front of 100 Wilshire, located at the intersection of Wilshire Boulevard and Ocean Avenue in Santa Monica, California. Completed in 1971, it is the tallest building in Santa Monica.

A longer version of "Can't Fall Asleep To A Lullaby" was included on Encore: More Greatest Hits, released in 1991. Originally released only on vinyl and cassette, Perspective was first issued in the CD format in the United States by the now-defunct One Way Records in 1998.

== Reception ==
Professional ratings
Review scores
Source	Rating
AllMusic	2/5 stars
The Rolling Stone Album Guide	1/5 stars

AllMusic concluded that the album's "slight" songs and over-reliance on synthesizers make it no more than an "endearingly mediocre" period piece. However, they did give a nod to "the natural harmonies of Gerry Beckley and Dewey Bunnell" and contended that the album is at least a significant improvement over its predecessor, Your Move.

== Track listing ==
No.	Title	Writer(s)	Length
1.	"We Got All Night"	Sue Shifren, Terry Britten	3:27
2.	"See How the Love Goes"	Shifren, Britten	3:17
3.	"(Can't Fall Asleep to A) Lullaby" (also typeset as "Can't Fall Asleep to a Lullabye")	Dewey Bunnell, Steve Perry, Bill Mumy, Robert Haimer	3:46
4.	"Special Girl"	Eddie Schwartz, David Tyson	3:47
5.	"5th Avenue"	Gerry Beckley	3:47
6.	"(It's Like You) Never Left at All"	Randy Goodrum	3:25
7.	"Stereo"	Beckley, Jimmy Webb	3:21
8.	"Lady with a Bluebird"	Bunnell, Mumy, Haimer	3:07
9.	"Cinderella"	Jennifer Kimball, David Vidal	3:57
10.	"Unconditional Love"	Beckley	3:08
11.	"Fallin' Off the World"	Bunnell, Mumy	3:30

== Personnel ==
America

- Dewey Bunnell – lead vocals, backing vocals (2–5, 9)
- Gerry Beckley – lead vocals, backing vocals (1–10)

with:

- Michael Boddicker – synthesizers (1, 5), synthesizer arrangements (5)
- Paul Fox – synthesizers (1)
- Arthur Barrow – keyboards (2, 4), bass (2, 4, 9), guitars (9)
- Bill Elliott – synthesizers (3, 7, 8), log drum (8), acoustic piano (10)
- Randy Kerber – synthesizers (3, 6)
- Matthew McCauley – synthesizers (3, 6, 10, 11), Oberheim DMX (3, 6, 7, 8, 10, 11), synth bass (11)
- Craig Huxley – synthesizers (5)
- James Newton Howard – synthesizers (6)
- Gary Chang – Fairlight programming (9)
- Paul Jackson Jr. – guitars (1, 5)
- Richie Zito – guitars (2, 4, 9), drum programming (2, 4, 9)
- Dean Parks – guitars (3, 6, 8, 10), bass (3, 6)
- Michael Landau – guitars (7, 8, 11), guitar solo (11)
- Marty Walsh – guitars (11)
- Nathan East – bass (1, 5, 8)
- Richard James Burgess – drum and percussion programming (1, 5), rhythm and synthesizer arrangements (1, 5)
- Marcus Ryle – Oberheim DMX (6, 7, 8, 10, 11), synthesizers (7, 10, 11), synth bass (7, 10)
- Paulinho da Costa – percussion (1, 5, 6, 8)
- David Kemper – percussion (3, 6, 7, 8, 11)
- Phil Kenzie – saxophone solo (3)
- Steve Perry – backing vocals (3)
- Timothy B. Schmit – backing vocals (9)

== Production ==
- Richard James Burgess – producer (1, 5)
- Richie Zito – producer (2, 4, 9)
- Matthew McCauley – producer (3, 6, 7, 8, 10, 11)
- America – executive producers
- Brian Reeves – engineer
- Mark Linett – recording, mixing
- Bob Schaper – additional recording
- Sabrina Buchanek – assistant engineer
- David Glover – assistant engineer
- Roy Kohara – art direction
- Koji Takei – design
- Phil Fewsmith – photography

Studios

- Recorded at Amigo Studios, Sunset Sound and United Western Recorders (Hollywood, California); Oasis Recording Studios (North Hollywood, California).
- Mixed at Larrabee West (West Hollywood, California); Amigo Studios and Sunset Sound.
