= Encore: More Greatest Hits =

Greatest hits album by America
- Released: June 24, 1991
- Recorded: 1971–91
- Genre: Pop, rock
- Length: 56:36
- Label: Rhino
- Producer: Gerry Beckley, Dewey Bunnell, Robert Haimer, Bill Mumy, Steve Levine

America chronology
In Concert (1985)	Encore: More Greatest Hits (1991)	Hourglass (1994)

Professional ratings
Review scores
Source	Rating
AllMusic	4.5/5 stars
The Rolling Stone Album Guide	1/5 stars

Encore: More Greatest Hits is the second major label compilation album by American folk rock duo America, released by Rhino Records on June 24, 1991.

== History ==
Warner Bros. Records released America's initial greatest hits offering in 1975. Entitled History: America's Greatest Hits, the collection remained a consistent seller and was certified platinum by the Recording Industry Association of America in October 1986. Although History contains many of America's most recognizable hits, it omits many of the group's fan favorites and all of its post-1975 material. From 1976 to 1984, America released two additional studio albums on Warner Bros. and five more on Capitol Records. While signed with Capitol, the group scored a major Top Ten hit with "You Can Do Magic" in 1982.

America's contract with Capitol ended in 1985 with the release of the live album In Concert. During the latter half of the 1980s, America focused its energies on the concert circuit, as the group was unable to land a follow-up recording contract.

This lack of output ended in 1991, when America released Encore: More Greatest Hits on Rhino Records. At the time, Rhino was fast building a reputation as a leader in re-releasing classic pop and rock recordings on the increasingly popular compact disc format. As its title suggests, the album was conceived primarily as a companion to the 1975 History compilation. Toward that end, the package contained several of the group's later hits, including "Today's the Day", "You Can Do Magic" and "The Border". It also included classic album cuts such as "Old Man Took" and "To Each His Own". Rhino included several "bonus" tracks on the CD version not found on the cassette version, including the 1983 hit "Right Before Your Eyes", the album debut of "Everyone I Meet is From California" (originally released only as the B-side of "A Horse with No Name"), and cuts like "Hollywood" and "Another Try". Moreover, the package included an extended-length edit of the adult contemporary hit "Can't Fall Asleep to a Lullaby". All of the tracks featured on Encore were making their debut on CD.

The main draw for fans of the group was the inclusion of four newly recorded tracks. "Nothing's So Far Away (As Yesterday)", sung by Bunnell and co-written with Bill Mumy and Robert Haimer, signaled America's evolution toward more mature lyrics and a return to its signature acoustic sound. Bunnell's other offering, "Hell's On Fire", was a hard-edged rocker that had become a concert favorite in previous years. Beckley provided all the instruments and vocals on his two tracks, "On Target" and "The Farm", rendering them closer to solo efforts than traditional America offerings. "On Target" was a slick, love-oriented pop song recorded and mixed by Steve Levine, while "The Farm" was a sparse, brooding track that reflected the plight of American farmers.

Although Encore marked America's return to the recording studio and indicated the direction of the group's artistic evolution, fans would have to wait another three years until America released its next full-length studio album, Hourglass, on the American Gramaphone label. Encore also represented the beginning of a period in which most of America's early material was released on CD for the first time. In 1992, the America albums Homecoming, Hat Trick, Holiday, Hearts, Hideaway, Harbor and Live saw their debut CD releases on Warner Bros.' Japanese distribution arm.

== Track listing ==
No.	Title	Writer(s)	Length
1.	"Nothing's So Far Away (As Yesterday)+"	Dewey Bunnell, Bill Mumy, Robert Haimer	3:36
2.	"On Target+"	Gerry Beckley, Mumy	3:53
3.	"Hell's on Fire+"	Bunnell, Mumy, Haimer	3:17
4.	"The Farm+"	Beckley	2:54
5.	"You Can Do Magic"	Russ Ballard	3:55
6.	"Hollywood*"	Bunnell	2:51
7.	"Another Try*"	Beckley	3:22
8.	"Old Man Took"	Bunnell	3:15
9.	"Today's the Day"	Dan Peek	3:17
10.	"(Can't Fall Asleep To A) Lullaby" (extended version)	Bunnell, Steve Perry, Mumy, Haimer	4:13
11.	"Survival"	Beckley	3:15
12.	"Everyone I Meet is From California*"	Peek	3:07
13.	"Right Before Your Eyes*"	Ian Thomas	3:53
14.	"Cornwall Blank"	Bunnell	4:24
15.	"To Each His Own"	Beckley	3:16
16.	"The Border"	Ballard, Bunnell	3:58

+ New Tracks

- CD Bonus Tracks
