= The Last Unicorn: The Lost Version =

2006 novella by Peter S. Beagle

- Front cover of the limited edition
- Author: Peter S. Beagle
- Cover artist: Michael Kaluta
- Series: Last Unicorn
- Genre: Fantasy
- Published: 2006 Subterranean Press
- Publication place: United States
- Media type: Print (limited hardcover)
- Pages: 92
- ISBN: 978-1-59606-083-8
- OCLC: 82369523

The Last Unicorn: The Lost Version is a fantasy novella by Peter S. Beagle, a preliminary version of the original manuscript of The Last Unicorn (1968), originally written in 1962. It was printed as a 1,000-copy limited edition hardcover by Subterranean Press in 2006.

This slim volume contained Beagle's original 85-page unfinished start on the story, plus a new introduction and afterword that set the fragment in context and discuss the differences between it and the complete novel published in 1968. These differences are extensive: the story takes place in the modern world, and aside from the unicorn and the butterfly, it contains none of the familiar characters from the novel. (The unicorn's traveling companion is a demon with two heads, one named Webster and the other Azazel.)

This original fragment was also scheduled to be reprinted in The First Last Unicorn and Other Beginnings, from Conlan Press in December 2014, but the publication was abandoned. Tachyon Publications reprinted the text again in 2018 under the title The Last Unicorn: The Lost Journey.
