= Two Hearts (story) =

2004 American fantasy novelette

- Author: Peter S. Beagle
- Series: Last Unicorn
- Genre: Fantasy
- Publisher: F&SF
- Publication date: October 2005
- Publication place: United States
- Media type: Print (magazine story)
- Preceded by: The Last Unicorn
- Followed by: "Sooz"

"Two Hearts" is a fantasy novelette by American author Peter S. Beagle, written in 2004 as a coda to The Last Unicorn (1968), despite his decades-long reluctance to continue the original story. It was first published as the cover story of Fantasy and Science Fiction magazine issue dated October/November 2005. It can also be found in Beagle's short story collection The Line Between (Tachyon Publ., 2006); in the deluxe edition of The Last Unicorn (New American Library ROC, 2007); The Very Best of Fantasy & Science Fiction: Sixtieth Anniversary Anthology (Tachyon, 2009); and Mirror Kingdoms: The Best Of Peter S. Beagle (Subterranean Press, 2010).

In 2023, the book The Way Home was released, consisting of two novellas – 2005's "Two Hearts" and the newly written sequel "Sooz".

== Plot summary ==
A young girl named Sooz lives in a village plagued by a griffin. The beast has preyed on the village's sheep and goats for years, but recently it has started killing children as well. Sooz embarks on a quest to recruit the King to save her village, and on the way runs into Schmendrick and Molly Grue (from The Last Unicorn). Upon reaching the king's castle, they find an aged King Lír, who on first glance does not seem to be up to the task of slaying a griffin. He suffers from bouts of forgetfulness, and is coddled by those around him. However, after being reminded of his younger days and his never-ending quest to once again find the unicorn that loved him (Amalthea), Lír readily accepts the mission and sets off with Sooz, Molly Grue, and Schmendrick to battle the griffin in the Midwood.

Sooz bonds with King Lír as they return to her village and helps to keep his mind in the present whenever his memory relapses. When they return to her village, and Lír (accompanied by Schmendrick and Molly) is setting off into the Midwood to slay the griffin, Sooz suddenly pleads with him not to go, fearing for his life. Lír, however, insists that it is his duty, and proceeds inward, leaving Sooz outside the forest.

When they are gone, however, Sooz's dog, Malka, eagerly chases into the Midwood after them. Sooz chases after Malka and comes across King Lír's battle with the griffin. Malka is killed trying to aid the king, and Lír manages to stab the griffin, putting out its lion heart. But a griffin (as Lír had told Sooz before) has two hearts: eagle and lion. The griffin, hurt but not slain, pounces on Lír after he courteously dismounts his horse, viciously wounding him. It is about to kill Sooz as well, but Schmendrick calls upon the unicorn Amalthea for aid. Amalthea quickly slays the wounded griffin and, though King Lír dies from his wounds (though not before joyously reuniting with the unicorn), she then brings Malka back to life with a touch of her magic horn.

Amalthea soon vanishes without a trace, and Schmendrick and Molly depart to bury King Lír. Sooz fears that she will never see them again, but Molly teaches her a special song to whistle, one that she must not whistle aloud until she is seventeen. When she does, someone—a friend—will come to her, Molly promises. Sooz hopes it will be Schmendrick and Molly; she would prefer them over even a unicorn.

== Awards ==
- Hugo Award for Best Novelette, 2006
- Nebula Award (Novelette), 2006
- World Fantasy Award short fiction finalist nomination, 2006
