= List of Billboard Hot 100 top-ten singles in 1982 =

This is a list of singles that have peaked in the Top 10 of the Billboard Hot 100 during 1982.

A total of 81 songs hit the top-ten in 1982, including 15 number-one singles, and 6 number-two hits.

Paul McCartney, Hall & Oates, Olivia Newton-John, and Diana Ross each had three top-ten hits in 1982, tying them for the most top-ten hits during the year.

== Top-ten singles ==
- (#) – 1982 Year-end top 10 single position and rank

List of Billboard Hot 100 top ten singles which peaked in 1982
Top ten entry date	Single	Artist(s)	Peak	Peak date	Weeks in top ten
Singles from 1981
December 12	"Harden My Heart"	Quarterflash	3	February 13	12
December 19	"I Can't Go for That (No Can Do)"	Hall & Oates	1	January 30	12
December 19	"Leather and Lace"	Stevie Nicks and Don Henley	6	January 23	8
December 26	"Trouble"	Lindsey Buckingham	9	January 16	5
Singles from 1982
January 9	"Centerfold" (#5)	The J. Geils Band	1	February 6	12
January 9	"Turn Your Love Around"	George Benson	5	February 6	6
January 16	"The Sweetest Thing (I've Ever Known)"	Juice Newton	7	February 13	7
January 30	"Hooked on Classics"	Royal Philharmonic Orchestra	10	January 30	2
February 6	"Shake It Up"	The Cars	4	February 27	7
February 13	"Open Arms"	Journey	2	February 27	10
February 13	"Sweet Dreams"	Air Supply	5	March 20	7
February 20	"That Girl"	Stevie Wonder	4	March 20	9
February 20	"Leader of the Band"	Dan Fogelberg	9	March 6	4
February 27	"I Love Rock 'n' Roll" (#3)	Joan Jett & the Blackhearts	1	March 20	12
March 6	"Mirror Mirror"	Diana Ross	8	March 6	3
March 6	"Take It Easy on Me"	Little River Band	10	March 6	2
March 13	"We Got the Beat"	The Go-Go's	2	April 10	9
March 20	"Make a Move on Me"	Olivia Newton-John	5	April 3	5
March 20	"Pac-Man Fever"	Buckner & Garcia	9	March 27	3
March 27	"Chariots of Fire"	Vangelis	1	May 8	9
March 27	"Freeze Frame"	The J. Geils Band	4	April 10	8
April 3	"Don't Talk to Strangers"	Rick Springfield	2	May 22	11
April 3	"Key Largo"	Bertie Higgins	8	April 17	4
April 10	"Do You Believe in Love"	Huey Lewis and the News	7	April 17	4
April 24	"Ebony and Ivory" (#4)	Paul McCartney and Stevie Wonder	1	May 15	12
April 24	"867-5309/Jenny"	Tommy Tutone	4	May 22	8
April 24	"'65 Love Affair"	Paul Davis	6	May 22	7
May 1	"I've Never Been to Me"	Charlene	3	May 22	6
May 8	"Did It in a Minute"	Hall & Oates	9	May 22	4
May 15	"The Other Woman"	Ray Parker Jr.	4	June 12	7
May 22	"Don't You Want Me" (#6)	The Human League	1	July 3	12
May 22	"Get Down on It"	Kool & the Gang	10	May 22	2
May 29	"Always on My Mind"	Willie Nelson	5	June 12	6
June 5	"Rosanna"	Toto	2	July 3	11
June 5	"Heat of the Moment"	Asia	4	June 26	6
June 12	"Crimson and Clover"	Joan Jett & the Blackhearts	7	June 19	3
June 12	"It's Gonna Take a Miracle"	Deniece Williams	10	June 12	2
June 19	"Hurts So Good" (#8)	John Cougar	2	August 7	16
June 19	"Let It Whip"	Dazz Band	5	July 17	6
June 26	"Love's Been a Little Bit Hard on Me"	Juice Newton	7	July 10	4
July 3	"Eye of the Tiger" (#2)	Survivor	1	July 24	15
July 3	"Caught Up in You"	38 Special	10	July 3	3
July 10	"Tainted Love"	Soft Cell	8	July 17	3
July 17	"Hold Me"	Fleetwood Mac	4	July 24	10
July 17	"Only the Lonely"	The Motels	9	July 17	4
July 24	"Abracadabra" (#9)	Steve Miller Band	1	September 4	14
July 24	"Keep the Fire Burnin'"	REO Speedwagon	7	August 14	6
July 31	"Hard to Say I'm Sorry" (#10)	Chicago	1	September 11	12
July 31	"Even the Nights Are Better"	Air Supply	5	September 4	8
August 14	"Vacation"	The Go-Go's	8	August 21	4
August 14	"Wasted on the Way"	Crosby, Stills & Nash	9	August 21	5
August 21	"Take It Away"	Paul McCartney	10	August 21	5
September 4	"You Should Hear How She Talks About You"	Melissa Manchester	5	September 18	5
September 11	"Jack & Diane" (#7)	John Cougar	1	October 2	10
September 18	"Eye in the Sky"	The Alan Parsons Project	3	October 16	8
September 25	"Who Can It Be Now?"	Men at Work	1	October 30	9
September 25	"Somebody's Baby"	Jackson Browne	7	October 16	6
September 25	"Love Is in Control (Finger on the Trigger)"	Donna Summer	10	September 25	1
October 2	"I Keep Forgettin' (Every Time You're Near)"	Michael McDonald	4	October 23	7
October 9	"You Can Do Magic"	America	8	October 16	6
October 9	"I Ran (So Far Away)"	A Flock of Seagulls	9	October 23	4
October 16	"Heart Attack"	Olivia Newton-John	3	November 6	7
October 23	"Up Where We Belong"	Joe Cocker and Jennifer Warnes	1	November 6	7
October 30	"Heartlight"	Neil Diamond	5	November 13	6
November 6	"Truly"	Lionel Richie	1	November 27	10
November 6	"Gloria"	Laura Branigan	2	November 27	10
November 13	"Muscles"	Diana Ross	10	November 13	6
November 20	"Mickey"	Toni Basil	1	December 11	10
November 20	"Maneater"	Hall & Oates	1	December 18	13
November 20	"Steppin' Out"	Joe Jackson	6	December 11	8
December 11	"Rock This Town"	Stray Cats	9	December 11	5

=== 1981 peaks ===
List of Billboard Hot 100 top ten singles in 1982 which peaked in 1981
Top ten entry date	Single	Artist(s)	Peak	Peak date	Weeks in top ten
November 7	"Waiting for a Girl Like You"	Foreigner	2	November 28	15
November 14	"Physical" (#1)	Olivia Newton-John	1	November 21	15
November 28	"Why Do Fools Fall in Love"	Diana Ross	7	December 19	6
December 5	"Let's Groove"	Earth, Wind & Fire	3	December 19	9
December 5	"Young Turks"	Rod Stewart	5	December 19	6
December 12	"Don't Stop Believin'"	Journey	9	December 19	4

=== 1983 peaks ===
List of Billboard Hot 100 top ten singles in 1982 which peaked in 1983
Top ten entry date	Single	Artist(s)	Peak	Peak date	Weeks in top ten
November 27	"The Girl Is Mine"	Michael Jackson and Paul McCartney	2	January 8	10
December 4	"Dirty Laundry"	Don Henley	3	January 8	10
December 11	"Sexual Healing"	Marvin Gaye	3	January 29	10
December 25	"Down Under"	Men at Work	1	January 15	10

== See also ==
- 1982 in music
- List of Billboard Hot 100 number ones of 1982
- Billboard Year-End Hot 100 singles of 1982
