= The Folk of the Air =

1986 novel by Peter S. Beagle

The Folk of the Air is a novel by Peter S. Beagle in which medievalists from 1980s California have magical interactions with people and spirits from the past. A sequel titled "Avicenna" has yet to be published.

== Plot summary ==
Nine years after graduating, musician Joe Farrell returns to his college town of Avicenna, California, somewhere near San Francisco. He’s come to stay with his oldest friend Ben Kassoy who is living with his older girlfriend Athanasia Sioris. Ben is now professor of Medieval Studies. Farrell also reconnects with his former lover Julie Takinawa who is working as a medical illustrator in town.

Julie and Ben are both members of the League of Archaic Pleasure which role plays medieval society on the weekend, similarly to the actual Society for Creative Anachronism, which was founded in Berkely in the 60's. It soon becomes clear that Ben is sometimes possessed by a ninth-century Viking and Athanasia has magical powers. 15-year-old Aiffe who attends the League turns out to be a witch who has summoned an immortal, Nicholas Bonner.

== Reception ==
Kirkus Reviews said it was a "Literate, warmly engaging work from a master stylist," with "vivid, life-sized characters and a sturdy plot." In the LA Times, Suzy McKee Charnas said, "Using the multicultural reality of his setting to the full, Beagle gives us characters of diverse backgrounds and magic of Africa and Asia as well as that of Europe--very refreshing." Dave Langford reviewed The Folk of the Air for White Dwarf #96, and stated that "Perhaps I'm disappointed that a writer as gifted as Beagle should only touch the surface of his medievalists, indulging a few ironies [...] but avoiding the depths of motivation which he's well fitted to plumb." After the book was out of publication, novelist Adrian Tchaikovsky called it his absolute favorite book and "one of the most beautifully written books I've ever come across."

== Reviews ==
- Review by Faren Miller (1986) in Locus, #310 November 1986(p 13)
- Review by Charles de Lint (1987) in Fantasy Review, April 1987
- Review by John C. Bunnell (1987) in Dragon Magazine, May 1987
- Review by Baird Searles (1987) in Isaac Asimov's Science Fiction Magazine, June 1987
- Review by Darrell Schweitzer (1987) in Aboriginal Science Fiction, September–October 1987
- Review by Tom Easton (1987) in Analog Science Fiction/Science Fact, October 1987 (p 180)
- Review by Maureen Porter (1987) in Vector 141 (p 18)
- Review by David L. Transue (1987) in Thrust, #28, Fall 1987
- Harrison, M John (Winter 1986). "'The Folk of the Air' by Peter S. Beagle (Book Review)". Foundation: 79. ProQuest 1312025561.
- Review by Orson Scott Card (1988) in The Magazine of Fantasy & Science Fiction, January 1988
- Review by Mary Gentle (1988) in Paperback Inferno, #70 (p 6)
- Review by Charles de Lint (1988) in Short Form, February 1988
- Review by Andy Sawyer (1988) in Paperback Inferno, #74 (p 13)
- Review by Phyllis McDonald (1988) in Interzone, #23 Spring 1988
