= Tamsin (novel) =

1999 novel by Peter S. Beagle

- Cover of hardcover edition Tamsin
- Author: Peter S. Beagle
- Cover artist: Paul Youll
- Language: English
- Genre: Fantasy
- Publisher: Roc Books
- Publication date: October 1, 1999
- Publication place: United States
- Media type: Print (Hardcover)
- Pages: 288
- ISBN: 0-451-45763-3
- OCLC: 41256401
- Dewey Decimal: 813/.54 21
- LC Class: PS3552.E13 T36 1999

Tamsin is a 1999 fantasy novel by American writer Peter S. Beagle. It won a Mythopoeic Award in 2000 for adult literature.

== Plot summary ==
Jenny Gluckstein, a moody Jewish-American teenager, lives in New York City with her divorced mother Sally. Jenny's closest confidante is her cat, Mister Cat. When Sally marries Evan, an Englishman with two sons, the family relocates to Dorset, where Evan has been hired to renovate 300-year-old Stourhead Farm. Due to the extent of the restoration, the family must live in the farm's dilapidated manor house plagued with unexplained annoyances: erratic electricity and plumbing, strange cold spots and odors, terrifying howling overhead on stormy nights, and a darkened third-story window that does not correspond to any room in the house. For Jenny, already upset with her mother's remarriage, the move, and the state of the house, the final straw comes when Mister Cat must be quarantined for six months. Jenny resolves never to accept her step-family or her new home.

After returning from quarantine, Mister Cat's presence attracts a ghostly Persian cat only he and Jenny can see. Following the cats one night, Jenny locates the mysterious third-story room, where she discovers the ghost of 19-year-old Tamsin Willoughby, daughter of the farm's original owner. Ghosts endure as long as they remember being alive, but Tamsin has blocked out the circumstances surrounding her death, including what became of her sweetheart Edric Davies. Jenny comes to believe something sinister happened the night Tamsin died.

Jenny and Tamsin become close friends, and Tamsin introduces Jenny to the numerous supernatural creatures that occupy the grounds, including the shape-shifting Pooka, while teaching her to avoid more dangerous beings such as the redcaps who occupy the nearby forest and the all-powerful Old Lady of the Elder Tree, who ruled the land before mankind came. Through her nightly conversations with Tamsin, Jenny learns about Judge Jeffreys, whose Bloody Assizes terrorized the surrounding area after the Monmouth Rebellion, and who once romantically pursued Tamsin. The Pooka warns that Tamsin's return has also summoned the ghost of Judge Jeffreys, who is still intent on possessing her. Jeffreys' presence makes it difficult for Tamsin to retain her memories, imperiling her existence.

As Jeffreys grows strong enough to impact the living, Jenny continues to research the farm's history and learns that Tamsin and Edric intended to elope in secret, but that Edric never arrived at the arranged meeting place. Tamsin waited hours in the rain before being discovered by Jeffreys. At Tamsin's bedside when she died of pneumonia, Jeffreys overheard her last words.

With this information, Tamsin is able to remember the night she died: delirious with fever and believing Edric abandoned her, she cursed Edric to wait for her as she had waited in vain for him. Jeffreys used the power of Tamsin's dying words to summon the Wild Hunt to chase Edric for all eternity, resulting in the screams heard on stormy nights. The cruelty of Tamsin's curse condemned her soul to be trapped at Stourhead. Only Tamsin is capable of undoing the curse and freeing both herself and Edric, but she is slowly succumbing to Jeffreys' more powerful and determined spirit.

On a stormy night when the Hunt is passing overhead, Jeffreys returns to claim a much-weakened Tamsin. With Jenny's encouragement, Tamsin calls down the Hunt and demands they release Edric, but Jeffreys, who still possesses power over the Hunt, sets them on Jenny. Jenny is forced to run for her life before encountering the Old Lady of the Elder Tree, disguised for centuries as cantankerous villager Mrs. Fallowfield, whose familiar (in the form of an ugly, vicious lapdog) Jenny has rescued from Mister Cat on several previous occasions. Because of this favor, the Lady rescues Jenny and turns the Wild Hunt on Jeffreys. The Lady commands Jenny to forget what she has witnessed, but before departing for the afterlife with Edric, Tamsin kisses Jenny, allowing her to remember.

Several years later, Jenny has matured from the angry, moody teen she once was and become closer with her step-family, a change she attributes to her friendship with Tamsin. Her research into Tamsin's life and times has given her a deeper appreciation of her new home's history. On the verge of leaving Stourhead to attend the University of Cambridge, Jenny fears she will never experience magic again. The Pooka appears to assure her that she herself has been changed by what she witnessed and that she will always share a connection with the magical world, no matter where she goes.

== Awards ==
- 2000 Mythopoeic Award
