= Jacob Weisman =

American editor of science fiction and fantasy

Jacob Astrov Weisman
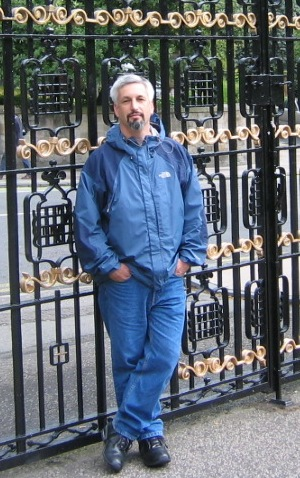
- Born: February 23, 1965 (age 61)
- Occupations: Science fiction publisher and editor
- Known for: Founding Tachyon Publications

Jacob Astrov Weisman (born February 23, 1965) is an American editor of science fiction and fantasy. He founded Tachyon Publications, an independent publishing house specializing in genre fiction, in 1995. His writing has appeared in The Nation, Realms of Fantasy, the Louisville Courier Journal, the Seattle Weekly, The Cooper Point Journal, and the college textbook Sport in Contemporary Society edited by D. Stanley Eitzen. His first novel, Egyptian Motherlode, co-written with David Sandner, was published in 2024.

Weisman received the World Fantasy Award—Anthology in 2018 for The New Voices of Fantasy (co-edited with Peter S. Beagle). He was also nominated for World Fantasy Awards' Special Award—Professional in 1999, 2009, 2010, and 2025 for his work at Tachyon, and won it in 2026.

He was raised and lives in San Francisco, where he and his wife Rina Weisman run the SF in SF (Science Fiction in San Francisco) reading series along with moderator Cliff Winnig.

== Books ==
=== Author ===
- Mingus Fingers (co-authored with David Sandner), 2019, Fairwood Press, ISBN 978-1-933846-87-3
- Hellhounds (co-authored with David Sandner, 2022), Fairwood Press, ISBN 978-1-958880-02-9
- Egyptian Motherlode (co-authored with David Sandner), 2024, Fairwood Press, ISBN 978-1-958880-21-0

=== Editor ===
- The Sword & Sorcery Anthology (co-edited with David G. Hartwell), 2012, Tachyon Publications, ISBN 978-1-61696-069-8
- The Treasury of the Fantastic (co-edited with David Sandner), 2013, Tachyon Publications, ISBN 978-1-61696-210-4
- Invaders: 22 Stories From the Outer Limits of Literature, 2016, Tachyon Publications, ISBN 978-1-61696-210-4
- The New Voices of Fantasy (co-edited with Peter S. Beagle), 2017, Tachyon Publications, ISBN 978-1-61696-257-9
- The Unicorn Anthology (co-edited with Peter S. Beagle), 2019, Tachyon Publications, ISBN 978-1-61696-315-6
- The New Voices of Science Fiction (co-edited with Hannu Rajaniemi), 2019, Tachyon Publications ISBN 978-1-61696-292-0
