= Hourglass (America album) =

Studio album by America
- Released: May 17, 1994
- Recorded: 1994
- Genre: Country rock
- Length: 48:16
- Label: American Gramaphone
- Producers: Gerry Beckley, Dewey Bunnell, Steve Levine

America chronology
Encore: More Greatest Hits (1991)	Hourglass (1994)	In Concert (1995)

Hourglass is the 13th studio album by American folk rock duo America, released by American Gramaphone in 1994. This was America's first new studio album since 1984's Perspective. Two singles were released from the album, "Young Moon" and "Hope", but did not chart in the U.S. The songs did receive more airplay in Europe. The song "Hope" became a theme song for the TJ Martell Foundation and was recorded by a group of country music stars in a fundraising effort for the Foundation. The recording of "You Can Do Magic" included here is not the hit version but a re-recording that is very similar.

Actor/musician Bill Mumy contributed to this album, co-writing "Sleeper Train" and "Greenhouse" and providing additional guitar work.

== Reception ==
Professional ratings
Review scores
Source	Rating
AllMusic	2.5/5 stars
The Rolling Stone Album Guide	1/5 stars

AllMusic asserted that the album "sounds both familiar and fresh" and that the songs are uniformly excellent, a surprise for a band as old as America. The opening track "Young Moon" "is as good as any of the group's hits."

== Track listing ==
No.	Title	Writer(s)	Length
1.	"Young Moon"	Gerry Beckley, Dewey Bunnell	4:27
2.	"Hope"	Beckley	5:21
3.	"Sleeper Train"	Bunnell, Bill Mumy, Robert Haimer	4:20
4.	"Mirror to Mirror"	Beckley	4:08
5.	"Garden of Peace"	Beckley, Bunnell	4:21
6.	"Call of the Wild"	Beckley	3:17
7.	"Whole Wide World"	Bunnell	3:25
8.	"Close to the Wind"	Beckley, Steve Levine	5:33
9.	"Greenhouse"	Bunnell, Mumy, Haimer	2:35
10.	"Ports-of-Call"	Beckley, Bunnell	4:11
11.	"Everyone I Meet Is From California"	Dan Peek	2:51
12.	"You Can Do Magic"	Russ Ballard	3:44
