= Angels in Notting Hill =

2016 film directed by Michael Pakleppa

- Promotional release poster
- Directed by: Michael Pakleppa
- Written by: Michael Pakleppa
- Starring: Selma Brook; Ryan Mercier; Tina Gray; Stefanie Wallis; Christopher Lee; Renée Castle; Vadim Kosmos; Angus Brown
- Production company: Continent Film
- Release date: 29 October 2016 (London)
- Running time: 99 minutes
- Countries: United Kingdom; Germany
- Language: English
- Budget: €500,000

Angels in Notting Hill is a 2016 independent fantasy film written and directed by Michael Pakleppa. An international co-production of the United Kingdom and Germany, it stars Selma Brook, Ryan Mercier, Tina Gray and Stefanie Wallis; it also features the voice of Christopher Lee, in one of his last film roles following his death in 2015. The film's plot follows an angel named Joy (Brook) who falls in love with a lonely human widower, Geoffrey (Mercier).

== Cast ==
- Christopher Lee as The Boss / Mr. President
- Selma Brook as Joy
- Ryan Mercier as Geoffrey
- Renée Castle as Rebecca
- Tina Gray as Miss Maple
- Angus Brown as Good Waiter
- Vadim Kosmos as Bob
- Stefanie Wallis as Suzie

== Production ==
Prior to the production of Angels in Notting Hill, actor Christopher Lee was attached to appear in a live-action film adaptation of the 1968 novel The Last Unicorn. According to director Michael Pakleppa, the adaptation, which was to be produced by Continental Film, "didn't work out in time". Instead, Lee and Pakleppa collaborated on the Continental Film-produced Angels in Notting Hill, in which Lee has a dual voice role as The Boss, an off-screen character, and Mr. President, a plush toy dog. For the latter character, puppeteer Mark Jefferis performed to Lee's pre-recorded voice lines. Pakleppa later stated:

It surely wasn't meant as a farewell [for Lee], but as a funny little intermezzo between his next big jobs. But I always wanted to see, or at least hear, him in roles that were not the usual villain horror stuff, but as ironical, sarcastic, warm-hearted, philosophical, and in many ways deep and wise as he really was. So, I took the chance to have in the film, since he was incredibly wide and open for experiments.

Angels in Notting Hill was filmed in London, England, between 2012 and 2015. Shooting took place in Notting Hill, Bayswater, Little Venice, the Grand Union Canal, Hackney, Brighton and Abney Park.

== Release ==
Angels in Notting Hill premiered in London on 29 October 2016.

=== Home media ===
The film was made available on video-on-demand (VOD) services in the United Kingdom, United States and Germany. A "collector's edition" DVD release, featuring an extended director's cut of the film that runs 11 minutes longer than its theatrical cut, was released by Absolut Medien.

== See also ==
- List of films about angels
