= The Last Unicorn =

1968 fantasy novel by Peter S. Beagle

- First edition dust jacket (Viking, 1968)
- Author: Peter S. Beagle
- Cover artist: Unknown (depicted); Gervasio Gallardo (first paperback)
- Language: English
- Genre: Fantasy
- Publisher: Viking Press
- Publication date: 1968
- Publication place: United States
- Media type: Print (hardcover)
- Pages: 218 (first); 248 (first paper); 288 (Deluxe Ed.)
- ISBN: 0-345-02892-9 978-0-7607-8374-0
- LC Class: PS3552.E13
- Preceded by: "The Woman Who Married the Man in the Moon"
- Followed by: "Two Hearts"

The Last Unicorn is a fantasy novel by American author Peter S. Beagle and published in 1968, by Viking Press in the U.S. and The Bodley Head in the U.K. It follows the tale of a unicorn, who believes she is the last of her kind in the world and undertakes a quest to discover what has happened to the other unicorns. It has sold more than six million copies worldwide since its original publication, and has been translated into at least 25 languages (prior to the 2007 edition).

In 1987, Locus ranked The Last Unicorn number five among the 33 "All-Time Best Fantasy Novels", based on a poll of subscribers; it ranked number eighteen in the 1998 rendition of the poll. It was recognized in 2024 as belonging to a "New Canon" of fantasy literature by Palgrave Macmillan, which published Peter S. Beagle's The Last Unicorn: A Critical Companion.

== Plot ==
Two hunters pass through a forest, but find no game. Frustrated, they believe the animals might be protected by a Unicorn's magic, and they call out the taunt that she is the last of her kind. The Unicorn hears, and is troubled. She travels through the land and discovers that humans no longer recognize her, seeing only a pretty white mare. A talking butterfly warns her that her kind have been caught and herded to a far away land by the Red Bull, and she goes in search of them. During her journey, she is taken captive by a traveling carnival led by the witch Mommy Fortuna, who uses illusion to make regular animals appear as mythical creatures. The Unicorn finds herself the only true legendary creature among the group, save for the harpy, Celaeno. Schmendrick, a hapless magician traveling with the carnival, sees the Unicorn for what she is, and frees her. The Unicorn frees the other creatures including Celaeno, who kills Mommy Fortuna.

The Unicorn and Schmendrick travel toward the castle of King Haggard, who keeps the Red Bull. When Schmendrick is captured by bandits, the Unicorn rescues him and attracts the attention of Molly Grue, the bandit leader's mistress. The three reach the town of Hagsgate, which was King Haggard's first conquest. A villager named Drinn tells them of a curse that the town will share in Haggard's fortune until someone from Hagsgate brings Haggard's castle down. Drinn says he found a baby boy in the town marketplace one night. He knew the child was the one in the prophecy, but left the baby alone, not wanting to lose the town's fortune. King Haggard found the baby that night and adopted it.

Molly, Schmendrick and the Unicorn continue to Haggard's castle, but are attacked by the Red Bull. Attempting to aid her, Schmendrick unwittingly turns the Unicorn into a human woman. Confused by the change, the Red Bull gives up the pursuit. The Unicorn is shocked by the feeling of human mortality. Schmendrick tells her that the spell is only an illusion, since he is immortal and only mortals can make real magic. The three continue to Haggard's castle, where Schmendrick introduces the Unicorn as "Lady Amalthea". Haggard welcomes them, hoping to gather clues to find more unicorns. Amalthea is courted by Haggard's adopted son, Prince Lír. Haggard reveals that he has trapped the unicorns in the sea for his pleasure, and that nothing else can bring him joy. He accuses Amalthea of coming to save the unicorns and says that he knows who she really is. But Amalthea has seemingly forgotten her true nature and her desire to save the unicorns.

Following clues given by a cat, Molly, Schmendrick, and Amalthea find the Red Bull's lair, joined by Lír. When the Red Bull attacks them, Schmendrick changes Amalthea back to her original form and he becomes mortal. Lír confronts the bull but is trampled. In a rage of grief, the Unicorn drives the bull into the sea. The unicorns are freed, and they run back to their homes, as Haggard's castle falls behind them.

The Unicorn revives Lír with the healing touch of her horn. He is now king after Haggard's death, and he tries to follow the Unicorn. As they pass through the now-ruined town of Hagsgate, they learn that Drinn is Lír's father, who abandoned him to fulfill the prophecy. Realizing that he has new responsibilities as king after seeing Hagsgate, Lír returns to rebuild it after accompanying Schmendrick and Molly to the edge of his kingdom. The Unicorn returns to her forest after telling Schmendrick that she is different from all the other unicorns now, because she knows love and regret. Schmendrick and Molly come across a princess in trouble and he tells her Lír is the hero to save her. Schmendrick and Molly sing a love song together.

== Characters ==
- The Unicorn is the protagonist of the story. She leaves the safety of her forest upon learning that she is the last unicorn in the world, with information about the Red Bull as her only clue. When she first encounters the Red Bull, Schmendrick manages to inadvertently change the Unicorn into a human female to confuse the Red Bull and force its withdrawal. Schmendrick calls her "Lady Amalthea" so as not to arouse King Haggard's suspicions. Her alias evokes the Greek goddess Amalthea.
- The butterfly is an eccentric character who happens upon the Unicorn at the beginning of the story. While speaking in riddles and songs, he manages to give the Unicorn some vital information about the fate of the other unicorns. The butterfly's dialogue is drawn from things that amused the author and his childhood friend during a trip to the Berkshire Hills, where Beagle began writing the novel.
- Mommy Fortuna is a wicked old witch, who uses her dark magic to run a sideshow carnival for profit. The carnival features what appear to be mythical creatures, but are actually normal animals that have been enchanted, with the exception of the harpy Celaeno. The name "Fortuna" alludes to the Roman goddess of fortune, and German mythical hero Fortunatus.
- Schmendrick is a bumbling magician who travels with Mommy Fortuna's traveling carnival purely to gain a living. Reduced to entertaining the sightseers who come to the carnival, Schmendrick wants nothing more than to become a true, powerful magician who does not rely on card tricks and cheap illusions. When he sees the captured Unicorn for what she is, he decides to free her and join her quest. Schmendrick was a character Beagle had initially made up for his children's bedtime stories, and was called "the world's worst magician". The name "Schmendrick the Magician" is a parody of the character "Mandrake the Magician". His name is also drawn from a Yiddish word schmendrick that Beagle defines as "somebody out of his depth, the boy sent to do a man's job, someone who has expanded to the limits of his incapacity."
- Captain Cully is the leader of a second-rate band of outlaws fighting King Haggard. Although he attempts to be dashing and hospitable, Cully falls victim to his own jealousy of famous mythical outlaws such as Robin Hood, an illusion of whom Schmendrick inadvertently conjures. According to Beagle, Captain Cully's name is drawn from an old English slang word for "buddy".
- Molly Grue is Captain Cully's common-law wife. As a young woman she had eloped with him, naively attracted to the romance of loving a woodland fugitive and sharing his life. Unfortunately, this turned into years of serving Cully's ragged vagrants as their camp cook. When she discovers Schmendrick leaving with the unicorn, she decides to follow them to help the unicorn in her quest. Molly Grue's name is drawn from a French word meaning "crane". While never initially making the connection, Beagle notes that it is possible that the name was also inspired by his "favorite writing teacher in high school".
- The Red Bull is blind but powerful, and associated with King Haggard as captor of unicorns. Its main weapon is fear. When the unicorn finally stands up to the Red Bull, the affiliation with King Haggard is ended.
- King Haggard is a miserable and cruel ruler who cares for no one, not even his adopted son Prince Lír. His loneliness and misery is alleviated only by the sight of unicorns, which drove him to capture them all for his own pleasure, in tandem with the Red Bull. While the king's name is quite literal, Beagle elaborated "on the one hand, it is a particular look, but on the other it's also a falconer's term. It's what you call an undomesticated hawk, a bird that knows the rudiments but is not reliable. If you fly a haggard, you might never see it again, it might go back to the wild." Adding how he has "never really been able to see [Haggard] as a villain", Beagle explains seeing much of his own character in Haggard to the point that he "felt sorry for him".
- Prince Lír is a skilled hero who was adopted by King Haggard, who found him in the town of Hagsgate. Prince Lír is the opposite of his adopted father, with a life of valor, honor, and compassion for others. He falls in love with Lady Amalthea, not realizing her true identity. For all of her arrogance towards humankind, the Unicorn falls in love with Lír. Beagle "knew that the prince's name had to be one syllable" and chose "Lír" because he liked the sound of it, but later noted he borrowed the name of a Celtic sea god, Llyr, added to the fact that becoming "King Lír" after succeeding his adoptive father "echoed Shakespeare".

== Conception and creation ==
It took Beagle "close to two years" to write The Last Unicorn; he states that "it was hard every step of the way". Beagle came up with the idea in 1962 while on an "artistic retreat" in Berkshire Hills after Viking Press rejected his novel The Mirror Kingdom. He stated that though the idea was "just suddenly there", he had "read tons of fantasy and mythology" from childhood, and that his mother told him that he had shared a story about unicorns during a visit to one of the elementary school classes she taught. As a child, he had loved the 1941 book The Colt from Moon Mountain by Dorothy P. Lathrop (a story about a unicorn in Kansas). The Spanish artist Marcial Rodriguez had given him a painting of unicorns fighting bulls when he was seventeen. Once he had the idea, he did research on unicorns at the Pittsfield Library.

The 85-page manuscript that Beagle first wrote differs greatly from the final version. Though the unicorn "is much the same", the story is set in modern times, and the unicorn is accompanied by a two-headed demon named Webster and Azazel. This original version was published as a limited edition hardcover by Subterranean Press titled The Last Unicorn: The Lost Version in 2006, later republished as The Last Unicorn: The Lost Journey by Tachyon Publications. Beagle stopped working on this initial manuscript in 1963, stating that "[i]t was a dead end", but picked the project up again in 1965.

Beagle dedicated the novel to Olfert Dapper, a reference to whom Beagle had come across during his research, as well as Robert Nathan, whose novel One More Spring influenced Beagle's A Fine and Private Place. In 2012, Beagle published a novelet, Olfert Dapper's Day, a fictional tale of Dapper's travels.

== Publication history ==
=== In English ===
There have been many print editions of The Last Unicorn.

A corrected, definitive English-language text was prepared for the 2007 Deluxe Edition and also used in the trade paperback 40th Anniversary Edition (Roc Books, 2008). The Deluxe Edition was available for purchase only from Barnes & Noble, with co-publishers Roc imprint and Barnes & Noble (OCLC 243775547). Beside the corrected text of the novel it included an edition of the sequel and new material including cover illustration by the prominent fantasy and children's book illustrators Leo and Diane Dillon.

In July 2022, the book was reissued.

In 2024, Suntup Editions produced a high quality hardcover edition with illustrations by Tom Kidd, in classic, numbered and lettered editions. This won the Locus Award for Best Illustrated and Art Book in 2025.

=== Audiobook ===
In 2004, Beagle recorded an unabridged audiobook of the novel for Conlan Press. The audiobook (2005) was sold in three formats, including downloadable MP3 files and an MP3-CD.

An eight-CD collector's set was announced, including an exclusive interview with Beagle, along with an autographed 3,000-copy limited hardcover edition of Two Hearts. Preorders began in late 2004; as of August 2014, the book and CDs were finished but not yet manufactured. Connor Freff Cochran of Conlan Press was found liable for financial elder abuse, fraud, and breach of fiduciary duty in 2019. Cochran declared bankruptcy sixteen hours before the trial. Beagle was unable to collect the money Cochran owed, and the rights to Beagle's work were left in legal limbo. In February 2021, Beagle regained the intellectual property rights. It is presumed that the promised edition will not be released.

In July 2022, The Last Unicorn was released on Audible, narrated by Orlagh Cassidy.

Clare Corbett and Christopher Ragland narrated the 2022 Orion/Gateway UK/international English edition, with an introduction by Patrick Rothfuss.

== Sequels and related works ==
Beagle published a coda story to The Last Unicorn titled "Two Hearts" in the October/November 2005 issue of Fantasy and Science Fiction magazine. Though beginning with a new narrator, four main characters from the original story appear again. The story is also included in the short story anthology The Line Between (published in July 2006), as well as in the deluxe edition of The Last Unicorn that was published in 2007. Two Hearts won the annual Hugo and Nebula Awards as the year's best novelette.

At the end of December 2008, Peter S. Beagle announced that he had written several new stories which were directly or indirectly linked to The Last Unicorn. These included three unicorn stories ("The Story of Kao Yu" about a Chinese ki-lin, "My Son Heydari and the Karkadann", and "Olfert Dapper's Day", a fictional account of the Dutch physician and writer's encounter with a unicorn in the Maine woods) and two Schmendrick stories ("The Green-Eyed Boy" and "Schmendrick Alone"). In 2017, these stories were gathered in a short story collection titled The Overneath. "The Green-Eyed Boy", which earlier appeared in the September/October 2016 issue of Fantasy and Science Fiction magazine, describes the early days of Schmendrick's apprenticeship under Nikos. A third completed Schmendrick story was also mentioned by Beagle in December 2008.

The short story collection Sleight of Hand from 2011 contains a Schmendrick story titled "The Woman Who Married the Man in the Moon", and "Oakland Dragon Blues", a story concerning the fate of the dragon from Beagle's abandoned early version of The Last Unicorn (circa 1962).

A novella entitled In Calabria, was published in 2017. In this work the appearance of a unicorn on a quiet Italian farm leads to upheaval, violence and death.

In 2023, the book The Way Home was released, consisting of two novellas – 2005's "Two Hearts" and the newly written sequel "Sooz".

== Adaptations ==
=== Rankin/Bass ===
In 1982, the novel was made into an animated film of the same name directed and produced by Rankin/Bass for ITC Entertainment, with a screenplay written by Beagle himself and animated by Topcraft (predecessor of Studio Ghibli). The music was composed and written by Jimmy Webb and performed by America. The voice actors include Christopher Lee, Angela Lansbury, Alan Arkin, Jeff Bridges, René Auberjonois, and Mia Farrow. The first DVD release of the film by Lionsgate was of poor quality; however, a "25th Anniversary Edition" DVD with superior quality was released in February 2007.

=== Continent Films ===
In addition, a live-action adaptation of the original book has been announced as in development for several years. However, it is not clear what progress (if any) has been made towards production.

In February 2006, Continent Films unveiled a new official website for the project which made clear that the film was still in development. It was not yet funded, did not have a shooting script, and had not been cast. In the new website, all actor names but Christopher Lee's had been removed; even Lee's involvement was revealed to be nothing more than a promise to appear in the film if he was available and if terms could be worked out with his agent. Lee died in 2015 and the website was changed in April 2016 to promote the 2015 film, Angels in Notting Hill, which was Lee's final appearance on screen. The website was changed back in August to The Last Unicorn; as of January 2022, the site bears only a background picture and the words "The Last Unicorn" and "This website is currently not in service".

=== Stage adaptation ===
In 1988, a stage adaptation of the novel was presented by the Intiman Playhouse in Seattle. Peter S. Beagle wrote the script, which was a musical presented in collaboration with Pacific Northwest Ballet. The production was directed by Elizabeth Huddle.

In fall 2009, a new stage adaptation was presented in Chicago by Promethean Theatre Ensemble.

=== Comic book ===
IDW Publishing published a six-issue comic book adaptation of The Last Unicorn beginning April 2010. It was intended to be followed by an adaptation of A Fine and Private Place.

== Reception ==
Cliff Ramshaw reviewed The Last Unicorn for Arcane magazine, rating it a 10 out of 10 overall. Ramshaw comments that "this latest edition gives a new generation of readers the chance to let a little beauty into their lives. Don't miss it."

The novel has proved perennially popular among queer and transgender audiences, and scholars have considered it influential on the association between the symbol of the unicorn and queer and transgender identity, pointing to a number of queer and transgender responses to it, including a gay bar named The Last Unicorn in the 1980s.

== Reviews ==
- Review by Fred Patten (April 1, 1968) in Shangri L'Affaires #72
- Review by M. John Harrison (December 1968) in New Worlds
- Review by Alexei Panshin (April 1969) in Fantastic
- Review by Gahan Wilson (October 1969) in The Magazine of Fantasy and Science Fiction
- Review by John Brunner (Autumn 1969) in Vector #54
- Review by Spider Robinson (June 1977) in Galaxy
- Review by Baird Searles (May 1979) in Isaac Asimov's Science Fiction Magazine
- Review by Peter Bernhardt (March 1988) in Riverside Quarterly
- Review by David Pringle (1988) in Modern Fantasy: The Hundred Best Novels
- Review by John C. Bunnell (May 1991) in Dragon Magazine
- Review by Jacek Dukaj (1995) in Nowa Fantastyka, #158 Listopad
- Review by Charles de Lint (June 2007) in The Magazine of Fantasy & Science Fiction
- Review by Sara Polsky (February 16, 2009) in Strange Horizons
- Review by Stephen E. Andrews and Nick Rennison (2009) in 100 Must-Read Fantasy Novels
- Review by Bill Fawcett and Jody Lynn Nye (September 2017) in Galaxy's Edge, Issue 28
