= David Sandner =

American poet (born 1966)

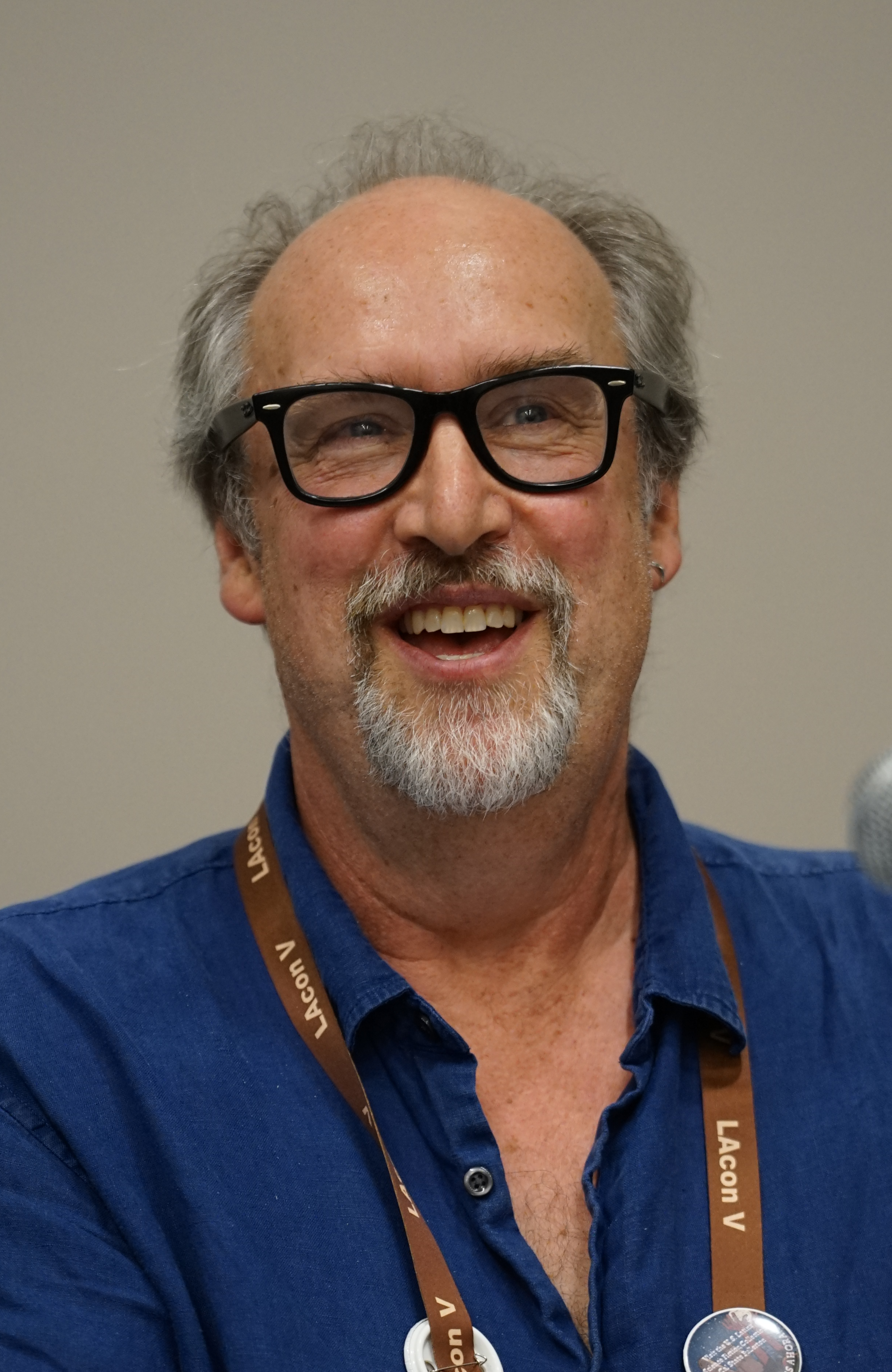
Sandner at Worldcon 2026

David Matthew Sandner (born 1966) is an author and editor of fantasy literature and a professor at California State University, Fullerton.

== Education and career ==
Sandner has a master's degree from San Francisco State University and a doctorate from the University of Oregon. His doctoral thesis was titled The fairy way of writing: fantastic literature from the romance revival to Romanticism, 1712–1830, and was completed in 2000.

He is a professor in the Department of English, Comparative Literature, and Linguistics at California State University, Fullerton.

Critical Discourses of the Fantastic, 1712–1831 (2011) was a two-time Mythopoeic Awards finalist. His Unburned Heart was a finalist for the 2024 Shirley Jackson Award for Best Novelette.

== Books ==
=== Fiction ===
- Mingus Fingers (with Jacob Weisman, Fairwood Press, 2019)
- Hellhounds (with Jacob Weisman, Fairwood Press, 2022)
- Egyptian Motherlode (with Jacob Weisman, Fairwood Press, 2024)
- His Unburned Heart (Raw Dog Screaming Press, 2024)

=== Non-fiction ===
- The Fantastic Sublime: Romanticism and Transcendence in Nineteenth-century Children's Fantasy Literature (Greenwood Press, 1996)
- Critical Discourses of the Fantastic, 1712–1831 (Ashgate Publishing, 2011)

=== As editor ===
- Fantastic Literature: A Critical Reader (Praeger Publishing, 2004)
- The Treasury of the Fantastic (with Jacob Weisman, Tachyon Publications, 2013)
- Philip K. Dick: Essays of the Here and Now (McFarland & Company, 2020)
- The Afterlife of Frankenstein: A Century of Mad Science, Automata, and Monsters Inspired by Mary Shelley, 1818-1918 (Lanternfish Press, 2023)
