= Peter S. Beagle =

American novelist and screenwriter (born 1939)

- Beagle at the 2026 World Fantasy Convention
- Born: Peter Soyer Beagle; April 20, 1939 (age 87); New York City, US
- Occupations: Novelist, screenwriter
- Writing career
- Period: 1960–present
- Genre: Fantasy
- Notable work: The Last Unicorn
- Notable awards: Hugo Award; 2006 Nebula Award; 2007; World Fantasy Award for Life Achievement; 2011 Damon Knight Memorial Grand Master Award; 2018

Peter Soyer Beagle (born April 20, 1939) is an American novelist and screenwriter, especially of fantasy fiction. His best-known work is The Last Unicorn (1968) which Locus subscribers voted the number five "All-Time Best Fantasy Novel" in 1987. He has won several literary awards, including a World Fantasy Award for Life Achievement in 2011. He was named Damon Knight Memorial Grand Master by SFWA in 2018.

== Early life ==
Beagle was born in the Bronx, in New York City, on April 20, 1939, the son of Simon Beagle and Rebecca Soyer. His father was a history teacher. Further, three of his uncles were noted painters: Moses, Raphael, and Isaac Soyer.

Beagle has said that The Wind in the Willows, a classic of children's literature by Kenneth Grahame, originally attracted him to the genre of fantasy.

He is Jewish. He was married to Enid Elaine Nordeen from 1964 to 1980. Together, they raised three children: Kalisa, Dan and step-daughter Victoria (Enid's daughter from a previous marriage). He married the author and visual artist Padma Hejmadi in 1988 and has since entered into a third marriage.

== Career ==
Beagle was raised in The Bronx, New York; he graduated from the Bronx High School of Science in 1955. He garnered early recognition from The Scholastic Art & Writing Awards, winning a scholarship to University of Pittsburgh for a poem he submitted as a high school senior. Beagle went on to graduate from the university with a degree in creative writing. Following a year overseas, Beagle held the graduate Stegner Fellowship in creative writing at Stanford University, where he overlapped with Ken Kesey, Gurney Norman, and Larry McMurtry.

Beagle wrote his first novel, A Fine and Private Place, when he was 19 years old; the novel was followed by a memoir, I See by My Outfit, in 1965.

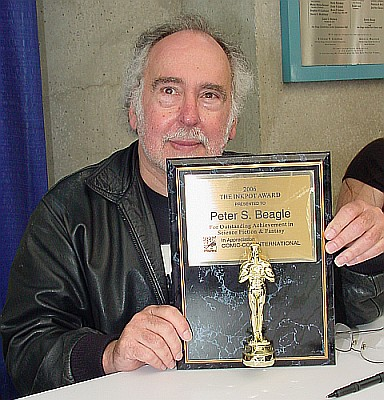
Beagle with the Inkpot Award at San Diego Comic-Con, 2006

He wrote an introduction for a 1973 American print edition of The Lord of the Rings. He and Chris Conkling co-wrote the screenplay for the 1978 Ralph Bakshi-animated version of The Lord of the Rings. Two decades later he wrote the teleplay for "Sarek", episode 71 of the television series Star Trek: The Next Generation.

With David Carlson as composer Beagle adapted his story "Come, Lady Death" into the libretto for an opera, The Midnight Angel, which premiered at the Opera Theatre of Saint Louis in 1993.

In 2005, Beagle published a coda to The Last Unicorn, a novelette entitled "Two Hearts"; he also began work on a full-novel sequel. Two Hearts won the Hugo Award for Best Novelette in 2006 and the parallel Nebula Award in 2007. It was also nominated as a short fiction finalist for the World Fantasy Award. Beagle also received a special Inkpot Award in 2006 for Outstanding Achievement in Science Fiction and Fantasy, and in 2007 the inaugural WSFA Small Press Award for "El Regalo", published in The Line Between (Tachyon Publications).

He is also a winner of the Jack Trevor Story Memorial Prize, also known as the Prix Goncourt, awarded to an outstanding humorous writer.

Beagle in 2006

IDW Publishing released a six-issue comic book adaptation of The Last Unicorn beginning in April 2010. The collected hardcover edition was released in January 2011, premiering at #2 on the New York Times Hardcover Graphic Novel bestseller list.

Beagle's 2009 collection of short fiction, We Never Talk About My Brother, was nominated for a World Fantasy Award.

In 2013, he collaborated with the musician Phildel on a new track "Dark Water Down", mixing poetry and music. They then appeared together at a gig at Cafe Du Nord in San Francisco.

=== Dispute with Granada media ===
Beagle's book The Last Unicorn was made into an animated film of the same name in 1982, based on a screenplay written by Beagle himself. In 1979, Beagle had a contract with ITC Entertainment, which entitled Beagle to 5% of the net profits in the animated property, and 5% of the gross revenues from any film-related merchandising. Since 1999 this film has been controlled by a British company, Granada Media International (a subsidiary of ITV plc).

From 2003 through 2011, Beagle was involved in a financial dispute with Granada over nonpayment of contractually due profit and merchandising shares. On July 29, 2011, Beagle announced at his Otakon appearance that he and ITV had reached an agreement that was beneficial to all parties, and should please fans of The Last Unicorn. On October 14, 2011, at his New York Comic Con appearance, he announced the first results of the deal.

=== Dispute with Connor Cochran ===
Beagle sued his former manager Connor Cochran in 2015 for $52 million. The Alameda County Superior Court judge Michael M. Markman found Cochran liable for financial elder abuse, fraud, and breach of fiduciary duty, awarding Beagle $325,000, as well as an additional $7500 for defamation, and an undetermined amount in attorney's fees.

Cochran declared bankruptcy 16 hours before the trial was due to begin. Beagle was unable to collect the money Cochran owed, and the rights to Beagle's work were left in legal limbo. In February 2021, Beagle regained the intellectual property rights; he bought the rights out of the bankruptcy for $600,000, money raised from business partners and friends.

== Published works ==
=== Novels and chapbooks ===
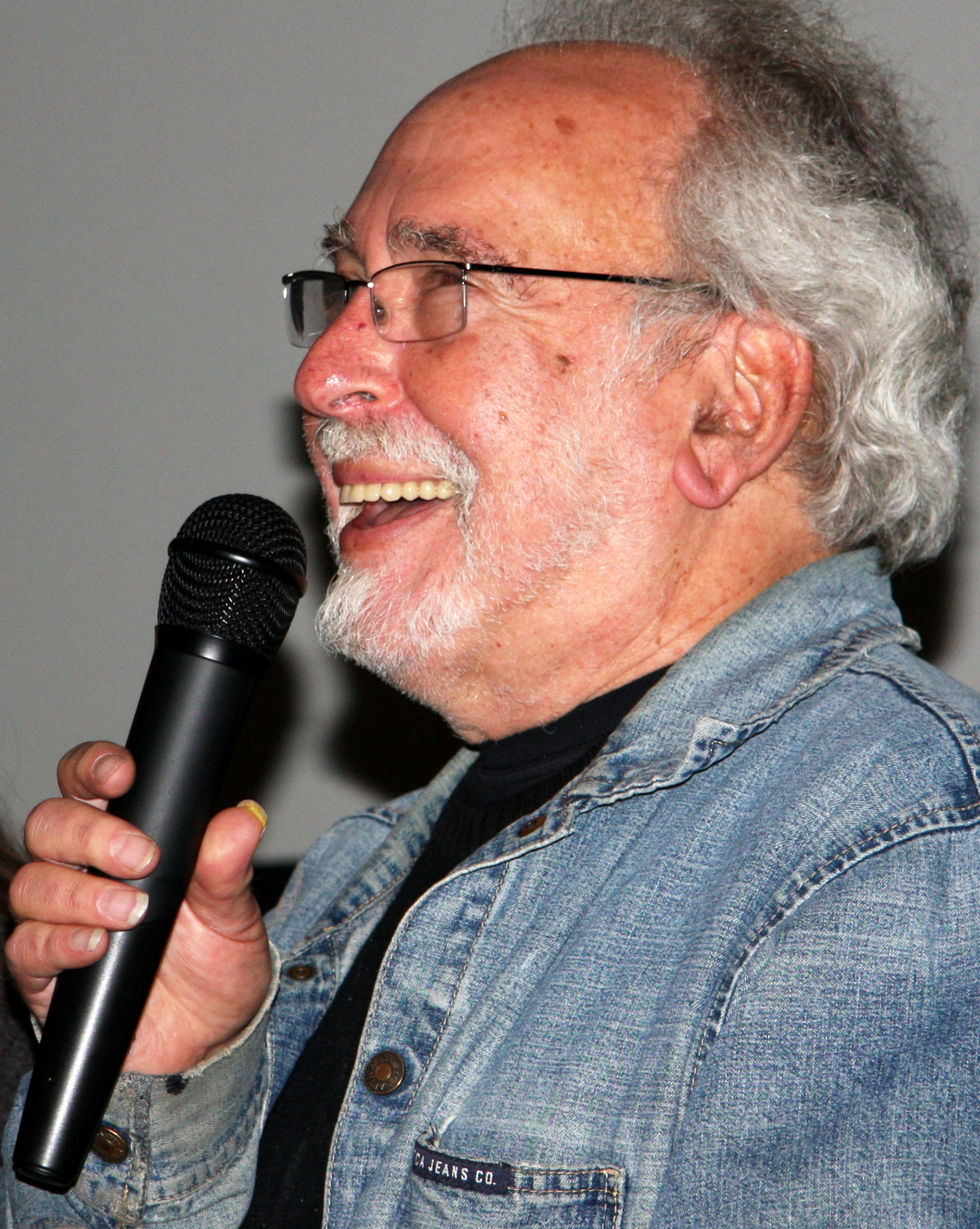
Beagle at a showing of The Last Unicorn in 2014

- A Fine and Private Place, 1960 (novel)
- The Last Unicorn, 1968 (novel)
- Lila the Werewolf, 1974 (chapbook edition of 1969 novelette)
- The Fantasy Worlds of Peter S. Beagle, 1978 (omnibus collection including A Fine and Private Place, The Last Unicorn, Come Lady Death, and Lila the Werewolf)
- The Folk of the Air, 1986 (novel, currently being rewritten and expanded for new release)
- The Innkeeper's Song, 1993 (novel)
- The Unicorn Sonata, 1996 (young adult novel, currently being rewritten and expanded into a 4-book series)
- Tamsin, 1999 (novel)
- A Dance for Emilia, 2000 (hardcover giftbook edition of novella) (Illustrated by Anne Yvonne Gilbert)
- Your Friendly Neighborhood Magician: Songs and Early Poems, 2006 (limited edition chapbook collection of song lyrics and poetry) (Tachyon Publications)
- The Last Unicorn: The Lost Version, 2007 (original novella-length draft, from Subterranean Press)
- Strange Roads, 2008 (3-story chapbook collaboration with Lisa Snellings-Clark for Dreamhaven Books)
- Return, 2010 (limited edition novella chapbook, Subterranean Press)
- Two Hearts, 2011 (unpublished limited edition chapbook of Hugo Award and Nebula Award-winning novelette sequel to The Last Unicorn)
- Summerlong, 2016, Tachyon Publications
- In Calabria, February 2017 (novella)
- The Last Unicorn: The Lost Journey, November 2018 (finished version of the original The Last Unicorn)
- I’m Afraid You’ve Got Dragons, May 2024

As editor

- Peter S. Beagle's Immortal Unicorn, 1995 (co-editor, original story anthology, split into two volumes when reprinted in paperback: Peter S. Beagle's Immortal Unicorn in 1998, and Peter S. Beagle's Immortal Unicorn 2 in 1999)
- The Secret History of Fantasy, 2010 (anthology from Tachyon Publications)
- The Urban Fantasy Anthology, 2011 (with Joe R. Lansdale)
- The New Voices of Fantasy, 2017 (with Jacob Weisman)
- The Unicorn Anthology, 2019 (with Jacob Weisman)

=== Short fiction ===
Collections

- Giant Bones, 1997 (original stories set in the world of The Innkeeper's Song); reissued in 1999 as The Magician of Karakosk and Other Stories
- The Rhinoceros Who Quoted Nietzsche and Other Odd Acquaintances, 1997
- The Line Between, 2006
- Strange Roads, 2008
- We Never Talk About My Brother, 2009, Tachyon Publications
- Mirror Kingdoms: The Best of Peter S. Beagle, 2010 (Subterranean Press, edited by Jonathan Strahan)
- Sleight of Hand, 2011, Tachyon Publications
- The Overneath, 2017, Tachyon Publications
- The Way Home, 2023, Penguin Random House

=== Non-fiction ===
- I See By My Outfit: Cross-Country by Scooter, an Adventure, 1965 (nonfiction)
- The California Feeling, 1969 (with photographer Michael Bry, nonfiction)
- American Denim, 1975 (nonfiction art book)
- The Lady and Her Tiger, 1976 (with Pat Derby, nonfiction)
- The Garden of Earthly Delights, 1982 (nonfiction art book)
- In the Presence of the Elephants, 1995 (nonfiction photo book)
- The Rhinoceros Who Quoted Nietzsche and Other Odd Acquaintances, 1997 (collection of fiction and nonfiction essays)

=== Audiobooks ===
These five audiobooks are unabridged readings by Beagle, except the first, which is abridged. Giant Bones is a collection of short fiction; the others are novels.

- The Last Unicorn, abridged (1990 cassette)
- A Fine and Private Place (2002 CD and cassette)
- Giant Bones (2002 CD & cassette)
- Tamsin (2002 CD and cassette)
- The Last Unicorn (2005 download), with original music by Jeff Slingluff

=== Screenplays ===
- The Dove, 1974
- The Greatest Thing That Almost Happened, 1977
- The Lord of the Rings, 1978
- The Last Unicorn, 1982
- "Sarek" episode of Star Trek: The Next Generation, 1990
- A Whale of a Tale, pilot episode for a TV serial adaptation of The Little Mermaid, 1992
- Camelot, 1998
- A Tale of Egypt, 1998

== Discography ==
- Peter Beagle Live!, Firebird Arts & Music, 1991, FAM-11008/UPC 0-4720-11008-4-9

== Awards ==
Source: The Locus Index to SF Awards

These are annual "best of the year" literary awards, with three exceptions (‡).

- 1987 Mythopoeic Fantasy Award, The Folk of the Air
- 1994 Locus Award, Fantasy Novel, The Innkeeper's Song
- 2000 Mythopoeic Fantasy Award, Adult, Tamsin
- 2004 Grand Prix de l'Imaginaire, Nouvelle étrangère, Le rhinocéros qui citait Nietzsche

That is, best foreign-language short fiction published July 2002 to June 2003, for the French edition (Gallimard, 2002, ISBN 9782070421473) of The Rhinoceros Who Quoted Nietzsche and Other Odd Acquaintances (1997)

- 2006 ‡ Inkpot Award (comics), Special citation
- 2006 Hugo Award, Novelette, "Two Hearts"
- 2007 Nebula Award, Novelette, "Two Hearts"
- 2007 WSFA Small Press Award (short fiction), "El Regalo"
- 2010 Locus Award, Novelette, "By Moonlight"
- 2011 ‡ World Fantasy Award for Life Achievement
- 2018 ‡ Damon Knight Memorial Grand Master Award

In 1987, Locus ranked The Last Unicorn number five among the 33 all-time best fantasy novels, based on a poll of subscribers. The 1998 rendition of the poll considered many book series as single entries and ranked The Last Unicorn number 18.
