= Right Before Your Eyes =

Single by America

from the album View from the Ground
- B-side: "Inspector Mills"
- Released: November 1982
- Recorded: Capitol (Hollywood)
- Genre: Soft rock
- Length: 3:47
- Label: Capitol Records 5177
- Songwriter: Ian Thomas
- Producer: Bobby Colomby

America singles chronology
"You Can Do Magic" (1982)	"Right Before Your Eyes" (1982)	"Jody" (1982)

"Right Before Your Eyes" (popularly known as "Rudolph Valentino") is a song written by Canadian singer and songwriter Ian Thomas, and introduced on the 1977 Ian Thomas Band album Calabash. His version reached #57 in Canada. It was also recorded by America for their 1982 album View from the Ground. The America version of "Right Before Your Eyes" was issued as that album's second single – following up America's Top Ten single "You Can Do Magic" – and rose to #45 on the Billboard Hot 100: the track's Adult Contemporary chart peak was #16. It reached 22 on the Contemporary Adult chart in Canada. "Right Before Your Eyes" was most popular in the Philippines during its release in 1982.

== Charts ==
Chart (1982) (America version)	Peak position
Canada Adult Contemporary (RPM)	22
US Billboard Hot 100	45
US Adult Contemporary (Billboard)	16
US Cash Box Singles Chart	49
