= In Concert (1985 America album) =

Live album by America
- Released: July 1985
- Recorded: June 1, 1985
- Venue: Arlington Theater, Santa Barbara, California
- Genre: Pop, rock
- Length: 33:31
- Label: Capitol
- Producer: Matthew McCauley

America chronology
Perspective (1984)	In Concert (1985)	Encore: More Greatest Hits (1991)

Professional ratings
Review scores
Source	Rating
AllMusic	2/5 stars

In Concert is the second official live album by American folk rock duo America, released by Capitol Records in July 1985. This was the sixth and last release by America on the Capitol Records label and was the first America album ever issued on the budding compact disc format. This was America's first album that failed to chart. No singles were released from the album.

Fans present at the actual performance at the Arlington Theater have claimed that additional songs performed by the group, but not included on the final release, included "Sandman," "Never Be Lonely," "Can't Fall Asleep To A Lullaby", and "Old Man Took."

== Track listing ==
1. "Tin Man" (Dewey Bunnell, Lee Bunnell) (3:30)
2. "I Need You" (Gerry Beckley) (2:25)
3. "The Border" (Russ Ballard, Bunnell) (3:54)
4. "Sister Golden Hair" (Beckley) (3:12)
5. "Company" (Bunnell) (3:28)
6. "You Can Do Magic" (Ballard) (3:56)
7. "Ventura Highway" (Bunnell) (3:25)
8. "Daisy Jane" (Beckley) (2:57)
9. "A Horse with No Name" (Bunnell) (3:52)
10. "Survival" (Beckley) (3:00)

== Reissues ==
A number of America CDs have been issued which recycle material from this particular concert recording, including the following:

- Ventura Highway & Other Favorites (1992)
- You Can Do Magic (1996)
- Premium Gold Collection (1996)
- Centenary Collection (1996)
- The Legendary America (1998)
- The Best of America (1999)
- Hits You Remember Live (2001)
- Live at Santa Barbara (2001)
