= Connor Freff Cochran =

Author, correspondent, and publisher

- Other names: Freff
- Occupations: Author; correspondent; publisher

Connor Freff Cochran (also mononymously Freff) is an author, correspondent, and publisher as a founder of Conlan Press.

== Career ==
Cochran originally founded the publishing house Conlan Press in Montara, California in 2005 to market and publish the works of Peter Beagle; in 2011, it was expanding to additional authors. By 2016, Cochran's self-published bio at Conlan Press also listed him as "an award-winning writer, artist, musician, producer, and performer [...] comic book writer-artist [...] and a graduate of the Ringling Brothers and Barnum & Bailey Clown College".

=== Creative work ===
Credited as Freff, Cochran designed the cover art for Galaxy Science Fiction's January and March 1975 issues.

=== Non-fiction ===
In 1984, Cochran was a US-based correspondent for BBC2's TV series Micro Live (credited as "Freff"), reporting on telephony and computing in the United States. By 1993 and through at least 2000, Cochran wrote opinion pieces in a series called Creative Options; entrants were published in Keyboard magazine and the bulletin of the Multidisciplinary Association for Psychedelic Studies. Cochran wrote the owner's manuals for Alesis' NanoPiano and NanoBass, and while the style of their prose was praised in 1998 by Electronic Musician, they were also found lacking in a technical sense.

=== Peter S. Beagle ===
By 2011, Cochran was the publisher for Peter S. Beagle, author of the 1968 novel The Last Unicorn. Cochran himself was featured on the audio commentary for The Last Unicorn Blu-ray, noted for "repeatedly plugging of a Last Unicorn comic". In early 2016, Cochran was listed as a publisher and executive editor for Conlan Press, a publishing house he founded that described itself as "launched in 2005 as a way to help author Peter S. Beagle".

In 2015, Beagle sued Cochran for US$52 million (equivalent to about $69M in 2024), "disgorgement of illegal gains and restitution, and dissolution of two corporations he co-owns with Cochran, Avicenna Development Corporation, and Conlan Press, Inc." On June 21, 2019, Judge Michael M. Markman of the Alameda County Superior Court found in favor of Beagle, awarding attorneys' fees plus $332,500 (equivalent to $408,928 in 2024) for "financial elder abuse, fraud, breach of fiduciary duty, and defamation." In his decision, Markman said of Cochran, "[he] presents as an extremely intelligent, articular, overly-aggressive hustler and pitch-man. Cochran's written work product attempting to promote Beagle's work is written as Cochran speaks – with a flair for the dramatic that is at best loosely based in truth." On March 23, 2021, Beagle regained from Cochran the intellectual property rights to his works.

Despite discharging his debts to Beagle via bankruptcy, Cochran appealed his sentence "as a means of disputing Beagle's claims of financial elder abuse, fraud, breach of fiduciary duty, and defamation." In December 2021, a California Court of Appeal did not rule on the matter, dismissing his appeal as moot.

=== Published works ===
- Freff; Gaughan, Jack (February 16, 1981). Scithers, George H. (ed.). "Snowflake". Isaac Asimov's Science Fiction Magazine. Vol. 5, no. 2. Davis Publications. pp. 90–98. ISSN 0162-2188. Archived from the original on June 12, 2024 – via the Wayback Machine.
- Freff (November 1986). "Tuning in to Wendy Carlos". Electronic Musician. ISSN 0884-4720.
- Freff (1989). Holland, K. Kimball (ed.). What's a Sampler?: A Basic Guide to the World of Digital Sampling. Milwaukee: Hal Leonard LLC.
- Cochran, Connor Freff (March 1993). "Left Hand, Wide Eye". Keyboard. ISSN 0730-0158.
- Cochran, Connor Freff. "The Rise and Fall of Moog Music". Keyboard. ISSN 0730-0158.
