= A Fine and Private Place =

1960 fantasy novel by Peter S. Beagle

- Dust cover of first edition
- Author: Peter S. Beagle
- Cover artist: George Salter
- Language: English
- Genre: Fantasy novel
- Published: 1960 (Viking Press)
- Publication place: United States
- Media type: Print (Hardcover)
- Pages: 272

A Fine and Private Place is a fantasy novel by American writer Peter S. Beagle, the first of his major fantasies. It was first published in hardcover by Viking Press on May 23, 1960, followed by a trade paperback from Delta the same year. Frederick Muller Ltd. published the first United Kingdom hardcover in 1960, and a regular paperback followed from Corgi in 1963. The first U.S. mass market paperback publication was by Ballantine Books in 1969. The Ballantine edition was reprinted numerous times through 1988. More recently it has appeared in trade paperback editions from Souvenir Press (1997), Roc (1999), and Tachyon Publications (2007). The work has also appeared with other works by Beagle in the omnibus collections The Fantasy Worlds of Peter S. Beagle (1978) and The Last Unicorn / A Fine and Private Place (1991). It has also been translated into Japanese, German, Russian, Czech, Hungarian, Portuguese, Korean, Spanish, Italian, and Romanian.

== Plot ==
The book takes its title from a verse from Andrew Marvell's "To His Coy Mistress": "The grave's a fine and private place,/But none, I think, do there embrace." The setting is the fictional Yorkchester Cemetery, where Jonathan Rebeck, a homeless and bankrupt pharmacist who has dropped out of society, has been living, illegally and unobtrusively, for nearly two decades. He is maintained by a raven who supplies him with food in the form of sandwiches stolen from nearby businesses.

The protagonist exhibits the peculiar ability to converse with both the raven and the shades of the dead who haunt the cemetery. Beagle portrays ghosts as being bound to the vicinity of their burial, with their minds and memories slowly fading away as their mortal forms return to the dust. As the plot proceeds, Rebeck befriends two recently arrived spirits, those of teacher Michael Morgan, who died either from poisoning by his wife or suicide (he cannot remember which), and of bookshop clerk Laura Durand, who was killed by a truck. The two ghosts fall in love, and each pledge themselves to each other "for as long as I can remember love."

The widow, Mrs. Klapper, discovers Rebeck while visiting her husband's mausoleum. The quiet existence of this unlikely quintet is diverted by philosophical conversation and the poisoning trial of Morgan's wife, word of which is regularly provided by the raven from the local newspapers.

After she is ultimately found innocent and her husband's death ruled suicide, Morgan faces separation from Laura when his body is removed to unhallowed ground. Rebeck, under the encouragement of Mrs. Klapper, is driven to find a way to reunite them, and finally takes leave of his unusual abode.

== Reception ==
In The New York Times, Orville Prescott called it "a first novel of considerable charm and much promise," noting its originality, "combination of wistful melancholy and tart humor," and "smooth, precise, graceful prose, bright with wit and sparkling with imaginative phrases." Less positively, he felt it "doesn't go far enough," "seems too slight to support so many pages," and had "too many repetitions, too many stretches where Mr. Beagle's fancy falters." While a month later, Edmund Fuller characterized the book as "a striking debut on several counts," possessed of "wit, charm and individuality–with a sense of style notable in a first novel." He disliked what he saw as tendencies to "occasional strident, inappropriate, irrelevant vulgarism" and sentimentality, and viewed the portrayed "philosophical concept of death [as] shallow." Nonetheless, he concluded Beagle was an author to watch.

Tom Morrow, whose review called the novel "a droll fantasy" in its title, referred to the novel as "a work-a-day little book–nothing unusual," before going on to illustrate all the unusual things about it. He devoted his column largely to plot summary.

George W. Feinstein stated that "[b]ased on a mildly amusing situation and fortified by mildly amusing dialogue, this fantasy suffers from distention."

The book has also received extensive review coverage in the science fiction and fantasy genre magazines. Galaxy reviewer Floyd C. Gale rated it five stars out of five, praising the novel as "tender, funny, and wise, about as different (and good) as a 'ghost' story can be." Reviewing a mid-1970s reissue, Richard A. Lupoff described it as "a marvelous fantasy. ... funny, gentle, tender, and profound."

Commenting on a 2007 edition, Charles de Lint called the novel "a great book," and "one of my favorite books," which on rereading he found "just as wonderful as I remembered it to be: beautifully written, the characters warmly drawn, the pages filled with conversations that run the gamut of the human condition." While he felt it "might seem quaint as it takes its time to tell its story," he noted "there's a reason that people still read Dickens and Austen, and there's a reason they'll appreciate this book: quality counts.".

Other reviewers include Gahan Wilson in The Magazine of Fantasy & Science Fiction, October 1969, Spider Robinson, also in Galaxy, June 1977, and Darrell Schweitzer in Science Fiction Review, February 1978.

== In other media ==
The novel was adapted into A Fine and Private Place: A Musical Fantasy with book and lyrics by Erik Haagensen and music by Richard Isen (Clearsong Records, 2004). This version has been withdrawn from further circulation or performance at the author's request.

IDW Publishing announced on June 14, 2012, that it would publish a comic book adaptation of the novel starting in September 2012, with a script by Beagle's own chosen adapter, Peter B. Gillis. However, the first issue of a planned series of five did not appear until July 2014, and as of February 2015 issue #2 had not yet been released.
