= The Last Unicorn (film) =

1982 animated film

- Theatrical release poster
- Directed by: Arthur Rankin Jr.; Jules Bass
- Screenplay by: Peter S. Beagle
- Based on: The Last Unicorn by Peter S. Beagle
- Produced by: Arthur Rankin Jr.; Jules Bass; Masaki Iizuka
- Starring: Alan Arkin; Jeff Bridges; Mia Farrow; Tammy Grimes; Robert Klein; Angela Lansbury; Christopher Lee; Keenan Wynn; Paul Frees; René Auberjonois
- Cinematography: Hiroyasu Omoto
- Edited by: Tomoko Kida
- Music by: Jimmy Webb
- Production companies: Rankin/Bass Productions; Topcraft Limited Company ITC Films
- Distributed by: Jensen Farley Pictures
- Release date: November 19, 1982
- Running time: 93 minutes
- Countries: United States; Japan
- Language: English
- Budget: $3.5–4 million
- Box office: $6.5 million (US) or $3.4 million

The Last Unicorn is a 1982 animated fantasy film directed and produced by Arthur Rankin Jr. and Jules Bass, from a script by Peter S. Beagle adapted from his 1968 novel of the same title. The plot concerns a unicorn who, upon learning that she is the last of her species on Earth, goes on a quest to discover what has happened to others of her kind. It was produced by Rankin/Bass Productions for ITC Entertainment and animated by Topcraft Limited Company.

Voice performers include Alan Arkin, Jeff Bridges, Mia Farrow, Angela Lansbury, and Christopher Lee. The soundtrack was composed and arranged by Jimmy Webb, and songs were performed by the group America and the London Symphony Orchestra, with additional vocals provided by Lucy Mitchell.

Although critical reviews were generally positive, the film was a commercial failure, grossing $6.5 million in the United States. It has since maintained a cult following. In 2003, the Online Film Critics Society ranked the film as the 96th greatest animated film of all time.

== Plot ==
A female unicorn learns from two hunters and a butterfly that she is the last of her kind after a malevolent entity called the Red Bull herded nearly all of the unicorns to the ends of the earth. The Unicorn then sets off on a journey to find them.

The Unicorn is captured by the witch Mommy Fortuna and displayed in her Midnight Carnival. Most of the attractions are regular animals enhanced by illusions to appear as mythical beasts. Fortuna uses a spell to create another horn on the Unicorn's head, as the carnival visitors cannot see her real form. Fortuna keeps the immortal harpy Celaeno captive as well, deeming the risk secondary to the deed's prestige. The Unicorn is befriended by Schmendrick, an incompetent magician who works for Mommy Fortuna. With his help, the Unicorn escapes and frees the other animals. Celaeno kills Fortuna.

The Unicorn and Schmendrick continue traveling until Schmendrick is captured by a group of bandits led by Captain Cully, who ties him to a tree. While attempting to free himself, Schmendrick brings the tree to life, and it attempts to seduce him until the Unicorn arrives and frees him. Molly Grue, Cully's lover, weeps at the sight of the Unicorn and abandons Cully to travel with them. When nearing the castle of King Haggard, the group encounters the Red Bull, a monstrous fire elemental. It attacks the Unicorn, and Schmendrick transforms her into a woman to save her. The Bull loses interest in her and departs, but the Unicorn panics over her newfound mortality. Schmendrick promises to undo the transformation upon completing their quest.

Schmendrick, Molly, and the now-human Unicorn proceed to the castle. Haggard is initially unwelcoming. Schmendrick introduces the Unicorn as Lady Amalthea, and requests that they become members of Haggard's court, only to be told that the only occupants of the castle are Haggard, his adopted son Prince Lír, and four ancient men-at-arms. Haggard agrees to lodge the trio, replacing his more competent wizard, Mabruk, with Schmendrick, and setting Molly to work in his scullery. Mabruk leaves after recognizing "Amalthea" for what she is, jeering that by allowing her into his castle, Haggard has invited his doom. Amalthea begins losing her memories and falls in love with Prince Lír, and considers abandoning her quest in favor of mortal love. Haggard reveals to Amalthea that he ordered the Bull to round up the world's unicorns and imprison them in the sea by his castle so that Haggard can admire them every day.

The castle's cat divulges the location of the Bull's lair to Molly. Molly, Schmendrick, Amalthea, and Lír enter the bull's den and are trapped there by Haggard. Schmendrick reveals Amalthea's true identity to Lír, who declares that he still loves her. Amalthea contemplates abandoning the quest to marry Lír, but he dissuades her. The Bull appears, no longer deceived by Amalthea's human form, and chases her. Schmendrick turns Amalthea back into a Unicorn, but she is unwilling to leave Lír's side. The Bull begins driving her toward the ocean, and Lír is killed while defending her. Enraged, the Unicorn forces the Bull into the sea. The missing hundreds of unicorns emerge from the water, causing Haggard's castle to collapse into the sea as he falls to his death.

On the beach, the Unicorn magically revives Lír before leaving him. Schmendrick assures Lír he has gained much by earning the love of a unicorn, even if he is now alone. The Unicorn later bids goodbye to Schmendrick, who feels guilty for burdening her with the experience of mortality, which could make her unable to properly rejoin her kind. She assures Schmendrick that he helped restore unicorns to the world, and thanks him for making her understand regret and love. Schmendrick and Molly watch the Unicorn depart for her forest home.

== Voice cast ==
- Mia Farrow as the Unicorn/Lady Amalthea, the eponymous "last unicorn" who, in her search for the other unicorns, is transformed into a young woman and learns about regret and love.
- Alan Arkin as Schmendrick, a magician who accompanies the Unicorn on her quest to find others like her. Beagle commented that he was a bit "disappointed" by the way Arkin approached the character because it seemed "too flat".
- Jeff Bridges as Prince Lír, King Haggard's adopted son who falls in love with Lady Amalthea. Although he is later told by Schmendrick that she is a unicorn, his feelings for her remain unchanged, as he says emphatically, "I love whom I love".
- Tammy Grimes as Molly Grue, the love of Captain Cully who joins Schmendrick and the Unicorn. While explaining that there was no particular reason that he did not write a detailed background for Molly Grue's character, Beagle stated that he has "always been grateful" to Grimes because she "brought such vocal life to the character that she covered things I didn't do."
- Robert Klein as The Butterfly, the creature that gives the Unicorn a hint as to where to find the other unicorns.
- Angela Lansbury as Mommy Fortuna, a witch who uses her illusory magic to run the Midnight Carnival, which showcases mythical creatures that are, in truth, just normal animals. Later, the harpy Celaeno, one of the two real mythical creatures, kills her and her henchman, Ruhk.
- Christopher Lee as King Haggard, the ruler of a dreary kingdom, who has never been happy, save for when he looks at unicorns. Beagle described Lee as "the last of the great 20th century actors, and either the most-literate or second-most literate performer I've ever met." When Lee came in to work, he brought his own copy of the novel wherein he took note of lines that he believed should not be omitted. Lee, who was fluent in German, also voiced Haggard in the German dub of the film.
- Keenan Wynn as Captain Cully, the leader of a group of bandits.
  - Wynn also voices The Harpy Celaeno, a real harpy that was captured by Mommy Fortuna, freed by the Unicorn, and kills Mommy Fortuna and Ruhk out of vengeance for trapping her.
- Paul Frees as Mabruk, King Haggard's court magician who is replaced by Schmendrick. Frees also voices the Cat that gives hints to finding the Red Bull, and the Tree that falls in love with Schmendrick. Don Messick and Nellie Bellflower have widely been miscredited in the latter two roles for several years (Bellflower's character never made it into the final cut of the film). The miscredits were confirmed on a behind the scenes discussion of the film on the Blu-ray.
- René Auberjonois as the Skull that guards the clock that serves as an entryway into the Red Bull's lair. Beagle praised Auberjonois' performance, saying "he could have played any role in that movie and I would have been happy ... He's that talented."
- Brother Theodore as Ruhk, a hunchback who works for Mommy Fortuna. He, along with Mommy Fortuna, is killed by the Harpy Celaeno.
- Jack Lester as Hunter #1, Old Farmer, Cully's Men
- Edward Peck as Jack Jingly, Cully's Men
- Kenneth Jennings as Hunter #2, Cully's Men

== Production ==
Peter S. Beagle stated that there had been early interest in creating a film based on the book. Those who expressed interest included Lee Mendelson and Bill Melendez of the Peanuts television specials, though Beagle had been convinced by one of their partners' wives that they were "not good enough", as well as former 20th Century Fox animator Les Goldman. At the time, Beagle believed that "animated was the only way to go" with regard to the film, and had never thought of making it into a live-action film. Arthur Rankin Jr. and Jules Bass' New York-based production company, Rankin/Bass Productions, had been the last studio that the film's associate producer, Michael Chase Walker, approached, and Beagle was first "horrified" when he was informed that they had made a deal with Walker. Beagle stated that he has since "…come to feel that the film is actually a good deal more than I had originally credited", and went on to say "There is some lovely design work – the Japanese artists who did the concepts and coloring were very good. And the voice actors do a superb job in bringing my characters to life…"

While Rankin/Bass provided the film's dialogue and story based on Beagle's work, the animation was done at Topcraft Limited Company in Tokyo, Japan, headed by former Toei Animation employee Toru Hara, with Masaki Iizuka being in charge of the production. The studio, which previously animated Frosty's Winter Wonderland (1976), The Hobbit (1977), The Stingiest Man in Town (1978), The Return of the King (1980) and other cel-animated projects from Rankin/Bass, would later be hired by Hayao Miyazaki to work on Nausicaä of the Valley of the Wind, and their core members eventually went on to form Studio Ghibli. According to Beagle, the final film ended up being "remarkably close" to his original script, although one scene at the end involving an encounter with a princess was "animated but eventually cut."

== Soundtrack ==
The musical score and the songs were composed and arranged by Jimmy Webb, and performed by the group America and the London Symphony Orchestra, with additional vocals provided by Lucy Mitchell. The Last Unicorn soundtrack was recorded at De Lane Lea Studios in Wembley, England in 1982. The album was released in Germany in 1983 by Virgin Records, but has not been released in the United States; it includes the film score's symphonic pieces. In his review for AllMusic, James Christopher Monger called it, "an appropriately somber and sentimental blend of fairy tale motifs and dark, Wagnerian cues".

The theme song is featured on the 1997 compilation album The Best of America.

== Release ==
U.S. distribution rights were sold to Jensen Farley when Universal Pictures, who were due to release Associated Film Distribution's product (including ITC) in the United States, were not keen on the film.

The Last Unicorn premiered in 648 theaters in the United States on November 19, 1982, and earned $2,250,000 on its opening weekend. It grossed a total of $6,455,330 in the U.S. and Canada.

== Home media ==
The film had been released on VHS, Betamax, CED and LaserDisc in the 1980s by CBS/Fox Video (under license from ITC Entertainment), Playhouse Video (under license from ITC Entertainment), and J2 Communications (under license from ITC Home Video) respectively. On April 27, 1994, LIVE Home Video under the Family Home Entertainment label re-released the film on VHS as part of the Family Home Entertainment Theatre lineup. The first U.S. DVD, released by Family Home Entertainment on March 16, 2004, was made from poor-quality pan-and-scan masters. The company's owner, Lionsgate, later licensed the German video masters and audio mix and came up with a "25th Anniversary Edition" DVD which was released in North America on February 6, 2007. It has audio and visual quality superior to the original U.S. release, and is in 16:9 widescreen format, but has several swear words edited out, and as a result of being taken from PAL masters, plays 4% faster than the original film, resulting in a slightly higher audio pitch than normal. The new DVD edition includes a featurette with an interview with the author, as well as a set-top game, image gallery, and the original theatrical trailer. As of October 2011, over 2,500,000 copies of the DVD have been sold. A Blu-ray edition of the film was released by Lionsgate on February 22, 2011; this release was sourced from a new transfer of the theatrical cut of the film, thus restoring the swearing and correcting the PAL speed-up issue, though the 25th Anniversary Edition was still included as an option on this release.

On June 9, 2015, Shout! Factory released new Blu-ray and DVD versions of The Last Unicorn entitled "The Enchanted Edition". This edition was transferred from a new widescreen 2K digital master, and includes the original uncensored audio as well as a commentary track with Peter S. Beagle, associate producer Michael Chase Walker, tour producer Connor Freff Cochran, and Conlan Press team members; highlights from the Worldwide Screening Tour; a new True Magic: The Story of the Last Unicorn featurette; animated storyboards; and the original theatrical trailer.

In the United Kingdom, ITV Studios Global Entertainment hold complete ownership of the film via their acquisition of ITC's entire feature film library, not including those released by Embassy Pictures, which are held by StudioCanal. Since 2009, ITV have been responsible for all home media releases of The Last Unicorn. The film was available on The Criterion Channel.

== Reception and legacy ==
On the review aggregator website Rotten Tomatoes, the film has a 75% rating on Rotten Tomatoes from 29 reviews as of December 2025. The site's critical consensus reads: "The Last Unicorn lacks the fluid animation to truly sparkle as an animated epic, but offbeat characters and an affecting story make it one of a kind for the true believers."

In a New York Times review, Janet Maslin called The Last Unicorn "an unusual children's film in many respects, the chief one being that it is unusually good [... and] features a cast that would do any live-action film proud, a visual style noticeably different from that of other children's fare, and a story filled with genuine sweetness and mystery." Regarding the ending she said, "no one of any age will be immune to the sentiment of the film's final moments, which really are unexpectedly touching and memorable".

Todd McCarthy in Variety praised the script and voice acting but was unimpressed by the film's animation. "However vapid the unicorn may appear to the eye, Mia Farrow's voice brings an almost moving plaintive quality to the character. For an actress to register so strongly on voice alone is a rare accomplishment." The review also praised the vocal talents of Arkin, Lee, and Frees.

Colin Greenland reviewed The Last Unicorn for Imagine magazine, and stated that "Beagle has kept all the good bits, including the jokes, the smart, wry dialogue, and many bursts of brilliant imagination, here captured in stylish special effects: the attack of the Red Bull, all made of fire; the binding of all the lost unicorns into the foam of the sea."

Beagle himself called the film "magnificent" in comparison to J.R.R. Tolkien's The Lord of the Rings, for which he also wrote the screenplay.

Scholars have documented a large number of queer and transgender viewers finding the film particularly resonant with LGBTQIA+ experience.

== See also ==
- List of films about witchcraft

== Bibliography ==
- Miller, Timothy S. (2024). Peter S. Beagle's The Last Unicorn: A Critical Companion. Palgrave Science Fiction and Fantasy: A New Canon (1st ed.). Cham, Switzerland: Palgrave Macmillan. doi:10.1007/978-3-031-53425-6. ISBN 978-3-031-53424-9. pp. 93–114.
