= View from the Ground =

Studio album by America
- Released: August 1982
- Recorded: 1981–82
- Studio: Amigo Studios and Capitol Studios (Hollywood, California); Criteria Studios (Miami, Florida); Abbey Road Studios (London, England).
- Genre: Soft rock
- Length: 39:44
- Label: Capitol
- Producer: Gerry Beckley, Dewey Bunnell, Russ Ballard, Bobby Colomby

America chronology
Alibi (1980)	View from the Ground (1982)	The Last Unicorn (1982)

View from the Ground is the tenth studio album by British-American folk rock duo America, released by Capitol Records in August 1982.

The album marked a comeback for the group, who had been written off since Dan Peek's departure five years prior. It was a modest hit in the US, reaching number 41 on the Billboard album chart, and produced two hit singles: "You Can Do Magic" reached number eight on the Billboard singles chart and number five on the adult contemporary chart, and "Right Before Your Eyes" (also popularly known as "Rudolph Valentino") peaked at 45 on the Billboard singles chart and 16 on the adult contemporary chart. "You Can Do Magic" spent more time on the charts, 20 weeks, than any other America single.

The song "Inspector Mills" was a hit in the Philippines in the 1980s and remains one of the band's best-known songs in the country.

== Reception ==
Professional ratings
Review scores
Source	Rating
AllMusic	2/5 stars
(The New) Rolling Stone Album Guide	1/5 stars

AllMusic gave high praise to the hit songs "You Can Do Magic" and "Right Before Your Eyes", but deemed View from the Ground "an exceptionally slick-sounding yet pedestrian album overall". They recommended that listeners instead seek out the two hits, especially "You Can Do Magic", on greatest hits compilations.

== Track listing ==
No.	Title	Writer(s)	Length
1.	"You Can Do Magic"	Russ Ballard	3:48
2.	"Never Be Lonely"	Gerry Beckley, Bill Mumy	3:45
3.	"You Girl"	Dewey Bunnell, Mumy, Robert Haimer	3:32
4.	"Inspector Mills"	Beckley	5:10
5.	"Love on the Vine"	Bunnell, Mumy, Haimer	3:02
6.	"Desperate Love"	Lenny LeBlanc, Ava Aldridge, Cindy Richardson	3:51
7.	"Right Before Your Eyes"	Ian Thomas	3:47
8.	"Jody"	Ballard	3:49
9.	"Sometimes Lovers"	Beckley	4:37
10.	"Even the Score"	Bunnell	3:36

== Personnel ==
America

- Gerry Beckley – vocals, keyboards (2–5, 9, 10), guitars (2–5, 9, 10)
- Dewey Bunnell – vocals, guitars (2–5, 9, 10)

with:

- Russ Ballard – all instruments (1, 8), backing vocals (1, 8)
- Chris Coté – keyboards (6, 7), backing vocals
- Jai Winding – keyboards (6, 7)
- Mark Isham – synthesizers (6, 7)
- Hadley Hockensmith – guitars (2–5, 9, 10)
- Steve Lukather – guitars (2–5, 9, 10)
- Bill Mumy – guitars (2–5, 9, 10)
- Dean Parks – guitars (2–5, 9, 10)
- Michael Woods – guitars (2–5, 9, 10)
- Mike Mirage – guitars (6, 7), backing vocals
- Rick Neigher – guitars (6, 7), backing vocals
- Brad Palmer – bass (2–5, 9, 10)
- Bill Linnane – keyboards (7)
- Mike Porcaro – bass (6, 7)
- Jeff Porcaro – drums (6, 7)
- Willie Leacox – drums (2–5, 9–10)
- Alvin Taylor – drums (6, 7)
- Matthew McCauley – string arrangements and conductor
- Christopher Cross – backing vocals
- Michael McDonald – backing vocals
- Tom Kelly – backing vocals
- Chuck Kirkpatrick – backing vocals
- Timothy B. Schmit – backing vocals
- Sara Taylor – backing vocals
- Carl Wilson – backing vocals

== Production ==
- Russ Ballard – producer (1, 8)
- America – producers (2–5, 9, 10)
- Bobby Colomby – producer (6, 7)
- Chuck Kirkpatrick – engineer (1, 8)
- Mark Linett – recording (2–5, 9, 10), mixing (2–5, 9, 10)
- David Cole – engineer (6, 7)
- Jeremy Smith – engineer (6, 7)
- Michael Verdick – mixing (6, 7)
- Wally Traugott – mastering
- Andrea Farber – production coordinator
- Susan Gilman – production coordinator
- Phyllis Chotin – art direction
- Michele Hart – art direction
- Bob Carroll – graphics
- Guy Webster – photography
- Katz-Gallin-Morey – management
- Mixed at Location Recording Service (Burbank, California) and Amigo Studios.
- Mastered at Capitol Mastering (Hollywood, California).

== Charts ==
Chart (1982)	Peak position
US Top LPs & Tape	41
Australia	55
Norway (VG-lista)	49
