= Tachyon Publications =

American book publisher

- Founded: 1995
- Founder: Jacob Weisman
- Country of origin: United States
- Headquarters location: San Francisco
- Distribution: Baker & Taylor Publisher Services
- Fiction genres: Science fiction, fantasy
- Official website: www.tachyonpublications.com

Tachyon Publications is an independent press specializing in science fiction and fantasy books. Founded in San Francisco in 1995 by Jacob Weisman, Tachyon books have tended toward high-end literary works, short story collections, and anthologies.

In 2013, Tachyon's publication After the Fall, Before the Fall, During the Fall by Nancy Kress won the Nebula Award and Locus Award for best novella. Also in 2013, Tachyon's publication of The Emperor's Soul by Brandon Sanderson won the Hugo Award for best novella.

From 1992 to 1994, Weisman also published Thirteenth Moon magazine, which featured short stories, poetry and essays by authors including Vicki Aron, Michael Astrov, M. J. Atkins, Simon Baker, Michael Bishop, Fred Branfman, Lela E. Buis, Paul Di Filippo, Linda Dunn, Alma Garcia, Lisa Goldstein, Brice Gorman, John Grey, Eva Hauser, Deborah Hunt, Knute Johnson, Lewis Jordan, Ursula K. Le Guin, Mary Soon Lee, Pamela Lovell, David Nemec, Lyn Nichols, Robert Patrick, David Sandner, Brian Skinner, Lia Smith, P. Stillman, Rob Sullivan, Pat Toomay, Inti Valverde, Peter Weverka and Wayne Wightman.

== Books published ==
The following books have been published by Tachyon Publications.

Title	Author
A Fine and Private Place	Peter S. Beagle
A Flock of Lawn Flamingos	Pat Murphy
After the Fall, Before the Fall, During the Fall	Nancy Kress
Ancient Rockets: Treasures and Trainwrecks of the Silent Screen	Kage Baker
Beyond the Rift	Peter Watts
Billet-doux	Thomas Disch
Bob the Angry Flower: Dog Killer	Stephen Notley
Booklife" Strategies and Survival Tips for the 21st-Century Writer	Jeff VanderMeer
Burn	James Patrick Kelly
Can't Catch Me and Other Twice-Told Tales	Michael Cadnum
Catalyst: A Novel of Alien Contact	Nina Kiriki Hoffman
Central Station	Lavie Tidhar
Cigar-Box Faust and Other Miniatures	Michael Swanwick
Cold in July	Joe R. Lansdale
Content: Selected Essays on Technology, Creativity, Copyright, and the Future of the Future	Cory Doctorow
Context: Selected Essays on Productivity, Creativity, Parenting, and Politics in the 21st Century	Cory Doctorow
Crucified Dreams	Joe R. Lansdale, ed.
Cultural Breaks	Brian Aldiss
Dancing on Air	Nancy Kress
Darkness: Two Decades of Modern Horror	Ellen Datlow, ed.
Deadman's Crossing	Joe R. Lansdale
Deadman's Road	Joe R. Lansdale
Digital Rapture: The Singularity Anthology	James Patrick Kelly and John Kessel, eds.
Dogs	Nancy Kress
Dreams of Distant Shores	Patricia A. McKillip
Dying (With No Apologies to Martha Stewart)	Michael Arnzen
Embracing the Starlight	Dave Smeds
EPIC: Legends of Fantasy	John Joseph Adams, ed
Eyes Like Leaves	Charles de Lint
Falling in Love With Hominids	Nalo Hopkinson
Feeling Very Strange: The Slipstream Anthology	James Patrick Kelly and John Kessel, eds.
Flaming Zeppelins	Joe R. Lansdale
Future Media	Rick Wilber, ed.
Futures Past	A.E. van Vogt
Ganglion and Other Stories	Wayne Wightman
Gravity's Angels	Michael Swanwick
Greetings and Other Stories	Terry Bisson
Hannu Rajaniemi: Collected Fiction	Hannu Rajaniemi
Hap and Leonard	Joe R. Lansdale
Hap and Leonard: Blood and Lemonade (forthcoming March 2017)	Joe R. Lansdale
Hap and Leonard Ride Again	Joe R. Lansdale
Hauntings	Ellen Datlow, ed.
Her Smoke Rose Up Forever	James Tiptree Jr.
Hollow World	Michael J. Sullivan
How to Mars	David Harris Ebenbach
I Live with You	Carol Emshwiller
In Calabria	Peter S. Beagle
Instructions	Bob Leman
In the Company of Thieves	Kage Baker
Invaders: 22 Tales from the Outer Limits of Literature	Jacob Weisman
Kafkaesque	James Patrick Kelly and John Kessel, eds.
Led Astray: The Best of Kelley Armstrong	Kelley Armstrong
The Line Between	Peter S. Beagle
Lot and Lot's Daughter	Ward Moore
Lovecraft's Monsters	Ellen Datlow, ed.
Medicine Road	Charles de Lint
Michael Swanwick's Field Guide to Mesozoic Megafauna	Michael Swanwick
Monstrous	Ellen Datlow, ed.
Neat Sheets: The Poetry of James Tiptree, Jr.	James Tiptree Jr.
Nightmares: A New Decade of Modern Horror	Ellen Datlow, ed
Not So Much, Said the Cat	Michael Swanwick
Numbers Don't Lie	Terry Bisson
Olympic Games	Leslie What
Omar	Sidney Bechet
Over the River and Through the Woods	Clifford Simak
Pirate Utopia	Bruce Sterling
Portable Childhoods	Ellen Klages
Portrait of Jennie	Robert Nathan
Promises to Keep	Charles de Lint
Reading the Bones	Sheila Finch
Rewired: The Post-Cyberpunk Anthology	James Patrick Kelly and John Kessel, eds.
Shambling Towards Hiroshima	James K. Morrow
Shatterday	Harlan Ellison
She Walks in Darkness	Evangeline Walton
Six Months, Three Days	Charlie Jane Anders
Sleight of Hand	Peter S. Beagle
Slipping: Stories, Essays & Other Writings	Lauren Beukes
Slow Bullets	Alastair Reynolds
Stable Strategies and Others	Eileen Gunn
Stagestruck Vampires and Other Phantasms	Suzy McKee Charnas
Standard Candles	Jack McDevitt
Steampunk	Ann and Jeff VanderMeer, eds.
Steampunk II: Steampunk Reloaded	Ann and Jeff VanderMeer, eds.
Steampunk III: Steampunk Revolution	Ann VanderMeer, ed.
Strange Itineraries	Tim Powers
Summerlong	Peter S. Beagle
Super Stories of Heroes & Villains	Claude Lalumière, ed.
Tales of Old Earth	Michael Swanwick
The Apes of Wrath	Richard Klaw, ed.
The Asimov's SF 30th Anniversary Anthology	Sheila Williams, ed.
The Asylum of Dr. Caligari (forthcoming June 2017)	James K. Morrow
The Best of Joe R. Lansdale	Joe R. Lansdale
The Best of Michael Moorcock	Michael Moorcock
The Best of Xero	Pat & Dick Lupoff, eds.
The Bible Repairman and Other Stories	Tim Powers
The Black Flame	Stanley Weinbaum
The Boss in the Wall	Avram Davidson
The Cat's Pajamas and Other Stories	James K. Morrow
The Cutting Room: Dark Reflections of the Silver Screen	Ellen Datlow, ed.
The Dog Said Bow-Wow	Michael Swanwick
The Essential W. P. Kinsella	W. P. Kinsella
The Emperor's Soul	Brandon Sanderson
The Fate of Mice	Susan Palwick
The First Last Unicorn and Other Beginnings (forthcoming)	Peter S. Beagle
The Good Humor Man	Andrew Fox
The Great Bazaar & Brayan's Gold	Peter V. Brett
The Hotel Under the Sand	Kage Baker
The James Tiptree Award Anthology 1	Karen Joy Fowler, Pat Murphy, Debbie Notkin, and Jeffrey D. Smith, eds.
The James Tiptree Award Anthology 2	Karen Joy Fowler, Pat Murphy, Debbie Notkin, and Jeffrey D. Smith, eds.
The James Tiptree Award Anthology 3	Karen Joy Fowler, Pat Murphy, Debbie Notkin, and Jeffrey D. Smith, eds.
The Kosher Guide to Imaginary Animals	Ann and Jeff VanderMeer
The Madonna and the Starship	James K. Morrow
The Mortal Immortal: The Complete Supernatural Short Fiction of Mary Shelley	Mary Shelley
The New Weird	Ann and Jeff VanderMeer, eds.
The Postmodern Archipelago	Michael Swanwick
The Rhinoceros Who Quoted Nietzsche and Other Odd Acquaintances	Peter S. Beagle
The Roberts	Michael Blumlein
The Search for Philip K. Dick	Anne R. Dick
The Secret City: A Novel	Carol Emshwiller
The Secret History of Fantasy	Peter S. Beagle, ed.
The Secret History of Science Fiction	James Patrick Kelly and John Kessel, eds.
The Shadow Hunter	Pat Murphy
The Stress of Her Regard	Tim Powers
The Sword and Sorcery Anthology	David G. Hartwell and Jacob Weisman, eds.
The Third Bear	Jeff VanderMeer
The Treasury of the Fantastic	David Sandner and Jacob Weisman eds.
The Uncertain Places	Lisa Goldstein
The Urban Fantasy Anthology	Peter S. Beagle & Joe R. Lansdale, eds.
The Very Best of Charles de Lint	Charles de Lint
The Very Best of Fantasy & Science Fiction	Gordon Van Gelder, ed.
The Very Best of Fantasy & Science Fiction, Volume 2	Gordon Van Gelder, ed.
The Very Best of Kate Elliott	Kate Elliott
The Very Best of Tad Williams	Tad Williams
The Wall of America	Thomas M. Disch
The Word of God: Or, Holy Writ Unwritten	Thomas M. Disch
Time Gypsy	Ellen Klages
Unity	Elly Bangs
We Are All Completely Fine	Daryl Gregory
We Never Talk About My Brother	Peter S. Beagle
Wicked Wonders (forthcoming May 2017)	Ellen Klages
Wonders of the Invisible World	Patricia A. McKillip
Year's Best Fantasy 6	David G. Hartwell and Kathryn Cramer, eds.
Year's Best Fantasy 7	David G. Hartwell and Kathryn Cramer, eds,
Year's Best Fantasy 8	David G. Hartwell and Kathryn Cramer, eds.
Yesterday's Kin	Nancy Kress
Your Friendly Neighborhood Magician	Peter S. Beagle
