= You Can Do Magic (song) =

1982 single by America

Single by America

from the album View from the Ground
- B-side: "Even the Score"
- Released: July 6, 1982
- Recorded: March 1982
- Studio: Abbey Road Studio 2, London
- Genre: Soft rock
- Length: 3:48
- Label: Capitol
- Songwriter: Russ Ballard
- Producer: Russ Ballard

America singles chronology
"Survival" (1980)	"You Can Do Magic" (1982)	"Right Before Your Eyes" (1982)

Music video
- "You Can Do Magic" on YouTube

"You Can Do Magic" is a song by singer-songwriter Russ Ballard that was recorded as a 1982 single by folk rock duo America from their album View from the Ground.

== Background ==
While the two band members Gerry Beckley and Dewey Bunnell only participated on the vocal track in the studio, Ballard played all the instruments, except for the drums recorded by longtime America touring drummer Willie Leacox.

The song was one of two Ballard compositions on View from the Ground, the other being "Jody". Ballard wrote both songs specifically for America at the behest of Rupert Perry, A&R vice president for Capitol Records. Ballard also produced the tracks marking a return to record production after a four-year hiatus; although Ballard had had earlier hits as a songwriter, "You Can Do Magic" was his first major hit credit as a producer.

"You Can Do Magic" proved a solid comeback vehicle for America whose last Top 40 hit—"Today's the Day"—had occurred in 1976; the second of two subsequent appearances on the Hot 100 was in 1979. "You Can Do Magic" returned America to the Top 40 in August 1982 with the track reaching No. 8 that October, and holding that position for five weeks. The popularity of "You Can Do Magic" was paralleled by the success of the parent View From the Ground album which rose to No. 41 on Billboard's listing of the top 200 albums, the first time an album by America as a duo (rather than the original trio) had appeared in that chart's upper half.

International chart placings for "You Can Do Magic" include No. 30 in Australia, No. 37 in Canada, No. 20 in Ireland, No. 27 in Italy, No. 12 in New Zealand, and No. 59 in the UK.

The success of "You Can Do Magic" led to America recording their 1983 album Your Move with Russ Ballard as producer. A re-recording of the song later appeared on the band's 1994 album, Hourglass.

In popular culture, it was used as an opening theme song to regionally-televised Baltimore Orioles games in 1982, a year before their World Series championship.

== Chart performance ==
=== Weekly charts ===
Chart (1982)	Peak position
Australia (KMR)	30
Canada Top Singles (RPM)	37
Canada Adult Contemporary (RPM)	13
Ireland (IRMA)	20
New Zealand	12
UK Singles (Official Charts)	59
US Billboard Hot 100	8
US Adult Contemporary (Billboard)	5
US Cash Box Top 100	7
US Radio & Records	3

=== Year-end charts ===
Chart (1982–83)	Rank
Australia	103
US Top Pop Singles (Billboard)	65
US Cash Box	42

== Certifications ==
Region	Certification	Certified units/sales
New Zealand (RMNZ)	Gold	15,000^{‡}
^{‡} Sales+streaming figures based on certification alone.

== Music video ==
The music video opens up with a gloved hand throwing glitter, which then pixelates into the band performing the song, amidst a cloudy background. Some shots feature a set of hands flipping cards (referencing the classic magic trick). On July 18, 2019, the video was officially uploaded on YouTube.

== Personnel ==
America

- Gerry Beckley – lead vocals
- Dewey Bunnell – vocals

Backing musicians

- Russ Ballard – acoustic, electric and bass guitars, keyboards, drums and backing vocals
- Chuck Kirkpatrick - additional backing vocals, recording engineer

== See also ==
- List of Billboard Hot 100 top 10 singles in 1982
