= Past to Present 1977–1990 =

- Original album artwork by Mark Ryden

Compilation album by Toto
- Released: June 18, 1990 (EU); August 21, 1990 (US)
- Recorded: 1977–1990
- Genre: Rock
- Length: 64:32
- Label: Columbia
- Producers: Toto; James Guthrie

Toto chronology
The Seventh One (1988)	Past to Present 1977–1990 (1990)	Kingdom of Desire (1992)

Singles from Past to Present 1977-1990
- 1. "Love Has the Power" Released: June 11, 1990; 2. "Out of Love" Released: August 1990; 3. "Can You Hear What I'm Saying" Released: September 3, 1990 (UK); 4. "Africa" Released: November 12, 1990 (NL)

Past to Present 1977–1990 is the first compilation album by American rock band Toto, released in 1990 by Columbia Records. It contains nine hit songs from the band's first seven albums, and four new songs recorded with new singer Jean-Michel Byron.

According to the band, it was Toto's record label Columbia who proposed the band work with Byron. Ultimately the band was not happy with his onstage antics and he was asked to leave the band. Steve Lukather became Toto's lead vocalist in 1991.

== Track listing ==
No.	Title	Writer(s)	Producer(s)	Length
1.	"Love Has the Power" (new)	Jean-Michel Byron; John Capek	James Guthrie; Toto	6:32
2.	"Africa" (from Toto IV, 1982)	David Paich; Jeff Porcaro	Toto	4:59
3.	"Hold the Line" (from Toto, 1978)	Paich	Toto	3:56
4.	"Out of Love" (new)	Steve Lukather; Byron	Guthrie; Toto	5:55
5.	"Georgy Porgy" (from Toto)	Paich	Toto	4:08
6.	"I'll Be Over You" (from Fahrenheit, 1986)	Lukather; Randy Goodrum	Toto	3:50
7.	"Can You Hear What I'm Saying" (new)	Paich; Mike Porcaro; Byron	Guthrie; Toto	5:02
8.	"Rosanna" (from Toto IV)	Paich	Toto	5:34
9.	"I Won't Hold You Back" (from Toto IV)	Lukather	Toto	4:59
10.	"Stop Loving You" (from The Seventh One, 1988)	Lukather; Paich	George Massenburg; Bill Payne; Toto	4:28
11.	"99" (from Hydra, 1979)	Paich	Toto; Tom Knox	5:12
12.	"Pamela" (from The Seventh One)	Paich; Joseph Williams	Massenburg; Payne; Toto	5:12
13.	"Animal" (new)	Paich; Byron	Guthrie; Toto	5:05

Note

- Some CD inlays and LP sleeves had the song "99" wrongly dated as a 1988 track.
- The only former Toto member not named in the compilation's credits is Fergie Frederiksen, lead vocalist on the 1984 album Isolation, as none of that album's tracks are featured.

== Personnel ==
Adapted from the album's liner notes.

Toto

- Jean-Michel Byron – lead vocals, backing vocals
- Steve Lukather – guitars, piano (4), backing vocals
- David Paich – piano, keyboards, synthesizers, organ, backing vocals
- Mike Porcaro – bass
- Jeff Porcaro – drums, percussion

Additional musicians

- Luis Conte – percussion (1, 4, 7, 13)
- Greg Adams – trumpet (13), horn arrangements (13)
- Lee Thornburg – trumpet (13)
- Tom Timko – alto saxophone (13)
- Emilio Castillo – tenor saxophone (13)
- Stephen Kupka – baritone saxophone (13)

Choir

- John Bahler – vocals (1, 4, 7), choir director
- Alexandra Brown – vocals (1, 4, 7)
- Alfie Silas – vocals (1, 4, 7)
- Carmen Twillie – vocals (1, 4, 7)
- Darryl Phinnessee – vocals (1, 4, 7)
- Debbie Hall – vocals (1, 4, 7)
- Gene Morford – vocals (1, 4, 7)
- Luther Waters – vocals (1, 4, 7)
- Lynn Davis – vocals (1, 4, 7)
- Maxine Waters – vocals (1, 4, 7)
- Oren Waters – vocals (1, 4, 7)
- Phillip Ingram – vocals (1, 4, 7)
- Phyllis St. James – vocals (1, 4, 7)
- Susan Boyd – vocals (1, 4, 7)
- Willie Green Jr. – vocals (1, 4, 7)

=== Technical ===
- Produced by Toto and James Guthrie
- Mixed by James Guthrie
- Assistant engineers – Ken Allardyce and Mike Reiter
- Illustration – Mark Ryden
- Mastered by Doug Sax at The Mastering Lab, Los Angeles, CA

== Charts ==
=== Weekly charts ===
Chart (1990)	Peak position
Austrian Albums (Ö3 Austria)	26
Dutch Albums (Album Top 100)	1
Finnish Albums (Suomen virallinen lista)	8
French Albums (SNEP)	3
Japanese Albums (Oricon)	28
German Albums (Offizielle Top 100)	13
Norwegian Albums (VG-lista)	9
Swedish Albums (Sverigetopplistan)	9
Swiss Albums (Schweizer Hitparade)	8
US Billboard 200	153

=== Year-end charts ===
Chart (1990)	Position
Dutch Albums (Album Top 100)	1
French Albums (SNEP)	73
German Albums (Offizielle Top 100)	66
Swiss Albums (Schweizer Hitparade)	37

Chart (1991)	Position
Dutch Albums (Album Top 100)	18

== Certifications ==
Region	Certification	Certified units/sales
Australia (ARIA)	Gold	35,000^{‡}
Finland (Musiikkituottajat)	Gold	39,929
France (SNEP)	Platinum	300,000^{*}
Germany (BVMI)	Gold	250,000^{^}
Japan (RIAJ)	Platinum	200,000^{^}
Netherlands (NVPI)	Platinum	100,000^{^}
Sweden (GLF)	Platinum	100,000^{^}
Switzerland (IFPI Switzerland)	Platinum	50,000^{^}
United Kingdom (BPI)	Silver	60,000^{*}
United States (RIAA)	Platinum	1,000,000^{^}
^{*} Sales figures based on certification alone.^{^} Shipments figures based on certification alone.^{‡} Sales+streaming figures based on certification alone.
