= Can You Hear What I'm Saying =

1990 single by Toto

- Canadian cassette cover

Single by Toto

from the album Past to Present 1977-1990
- A-side: Africa (double A-side)
- B-side: "Goodbye Elenore" (Japan); "Hold the Line" (Europe); "The Seventh One" (Australia/Canada); "I'll Be Over You" (Netherlands)
- Released: September 3, 1990
- Recorded: 1990
- Studio: Bearsville Studios, Bearsville, New York; Schnee Studio, North Hollywood
- Genre: Funk rock
- Length: 5:02 (album version); 4:14 (single version); 4:47 (video version)
- Label: Columbia
- Songwriters: David Paich; Mike Porcaro; Jean-Michel Byron
- Producers: Toto; James Guthrie

Toto singles chronology
"Out of Love" (1990)	"Can You Hear What I'm Saying" (1990)	"Don't Chain My Heart" (1992)

Music video
- "Can You Hear What I'm Saying" on YouTube

"Can You Hear What I'm Saying" is a song recorded by the American rock band Toto. The song was written by David Paich, Mike Porcaro and Jean-Michel Byron. It was one of the four new tracks on their first compilation album Past to Present 1977–1990 featuring Byron as their lead vocalist.

"Can You Hear What I'm Saying" was released as a double A-side with "Africa" in the UK and peaked at No. 80 on the UK Official Singles Chart in 1990. It was released as a standalone single in other countries including Canada, Australia, Japan, and the Netherlands.

== Reception ==
Something Else! Reviews described "Can You Hear What I'm Saying" as "one of the better songs Toto has ever recorded." The review highlighted the work of the rhythm section, saying that "Mike and Jeff Porcaro are so in sync, so in the pocket together, that they sound as one." They said concluded that the track "remains a joy to listen to" and argued that it deserves renewed attention in the band's live performances.

== Track listings ==
7-inch single, UK (1990)
No.	Title	Length
1.	"Africa"	4:55
2.	"Can You Hear What I'm Saying"	4:14

CD single, UK (1990)
No.	Title	Length
1.	"Africa"	4:55
2.	"Can You Hear What I'm Saying"	4:14
3.	"Georgy Porgy"	4:09
4.	"Waiting for Your Love"	4:12

7-inch single, EU (1990)
No.	Title	Length
1.	"Can You Hear What I'm Saying"	5:02
2.	"Hold the Line"	3:56

12-inch, CD and mini single, JP (1990)
No.	Title	Length
1.	"Can You Hear What I'm Saying"	5:02
2.	"Goodbye Elenore"	4:52

7-inch, cassette single, Australia, Canada (1990)
No.	Title	Length
1.	"Can You Hear What I'm Saying"	5:02
2.	"The Seventh One"	6:20

7-inch single, Netherlands (1991)
No.	Title	Length
1.	"Can You Hear What I'm Saying"	5:02
2.	"I'll Be Over You"	3:51

== Personnel ==
=== Toto ===
- Jean-Michel Byron – lead vocals, backing vocals
- Steve Lukather – guitars, backing vocals
- David Paich – keyboards, backing vocals
- Mike Porcaro – bass
- Jeff Porcaro – drums

=== Additional musicians ===
- Luis Conte – percussion
- John Bahler – backing vocals, choir director
- Susan Boyd – backing vocals
- Alexandra Brown – backing vocals
- Lynn Davis – backing vocals
- Willie Green Jr. – backing vocals
- Debbie Hall – backing vocals
- Phillip Ingram – backing vocals
- Gene Morford – backing vocals
- Darryl Phinnessee – backing vocals
- Alfie Silas – backing vocals
- Phyllis St. James – backing vocals
- Carmen Twillie – backing vocals
- Luther Waters – backing vocals
- Maxine Waters Willard – backing vocals
- Oren Waters – backing vocals

== Charts ==
Chart (1990)	Peak position
UK Singles (Official Charts)	80

Chart (1991)	Peak position
Netherlands (Single Top 100)	44

== Release history ==
Region	Date	Format(s)	Ref.
United Kingdom	September 3, 1990	7-inch; CD	
Japan	September 21, 1990	CD; cassette; mini	
Australia	October 8, 1990	7-inch	
Canada	1990	Cassette	
Netherlands	March 25, 1991	7-inch; CD; maxi; mini	
