= List of RPM number-one adult contemporary singles of 1983 =

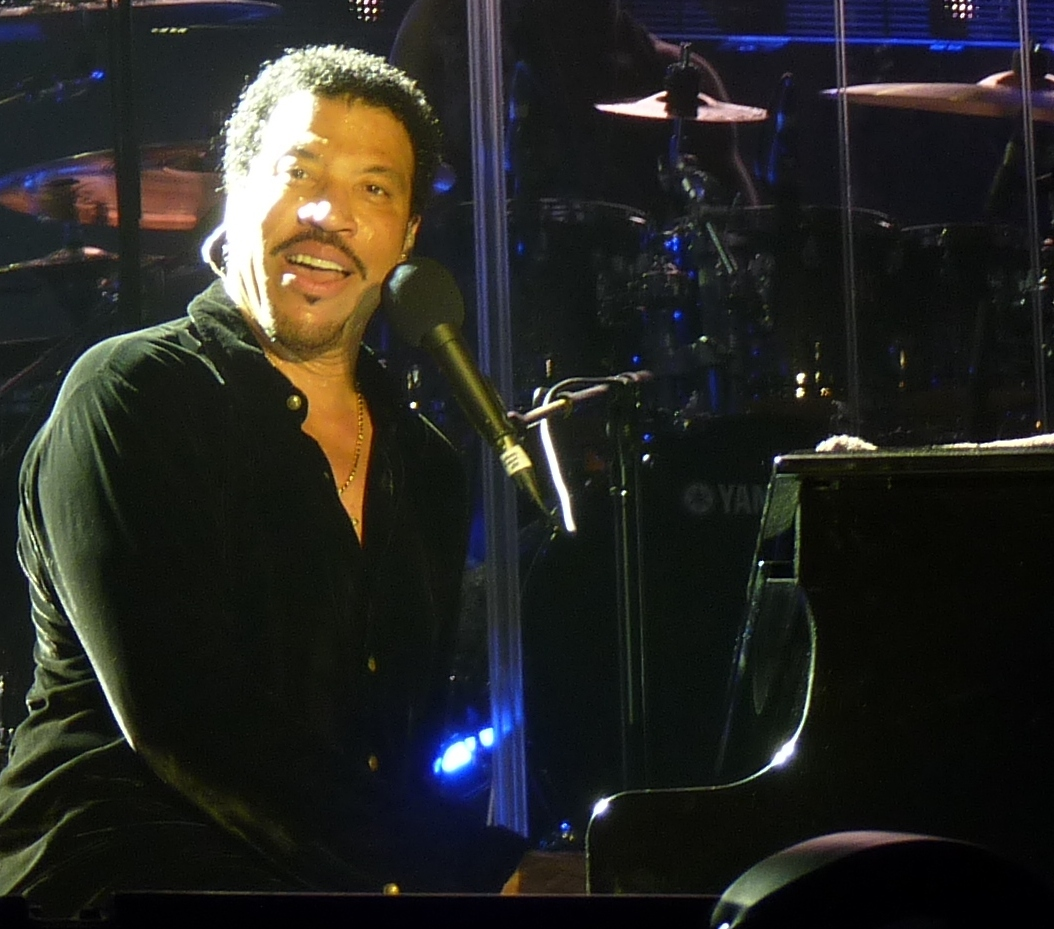
Lionel Richie (pictured in 2011) had the most number-one singles in the 1983 RPM Contemporary Adult charts, with "You Are", "My Love" and "All Night Long (All Night)".

In 1983, RPM magazine published a chart for top-performing singles in the adult contemporary category in Canada. The chart, entitled Contemporary Adult, has undergone numerous name changes and has become Adult Contemporary from 1984 to September 1988, and May 1989 until the magazine's final publication in November 2000. In 1983, 39 individual songs topped the chart, which contained 30 positions and is based on record sales and adult contemporary radio station playlist submissions.

== Chart history ==
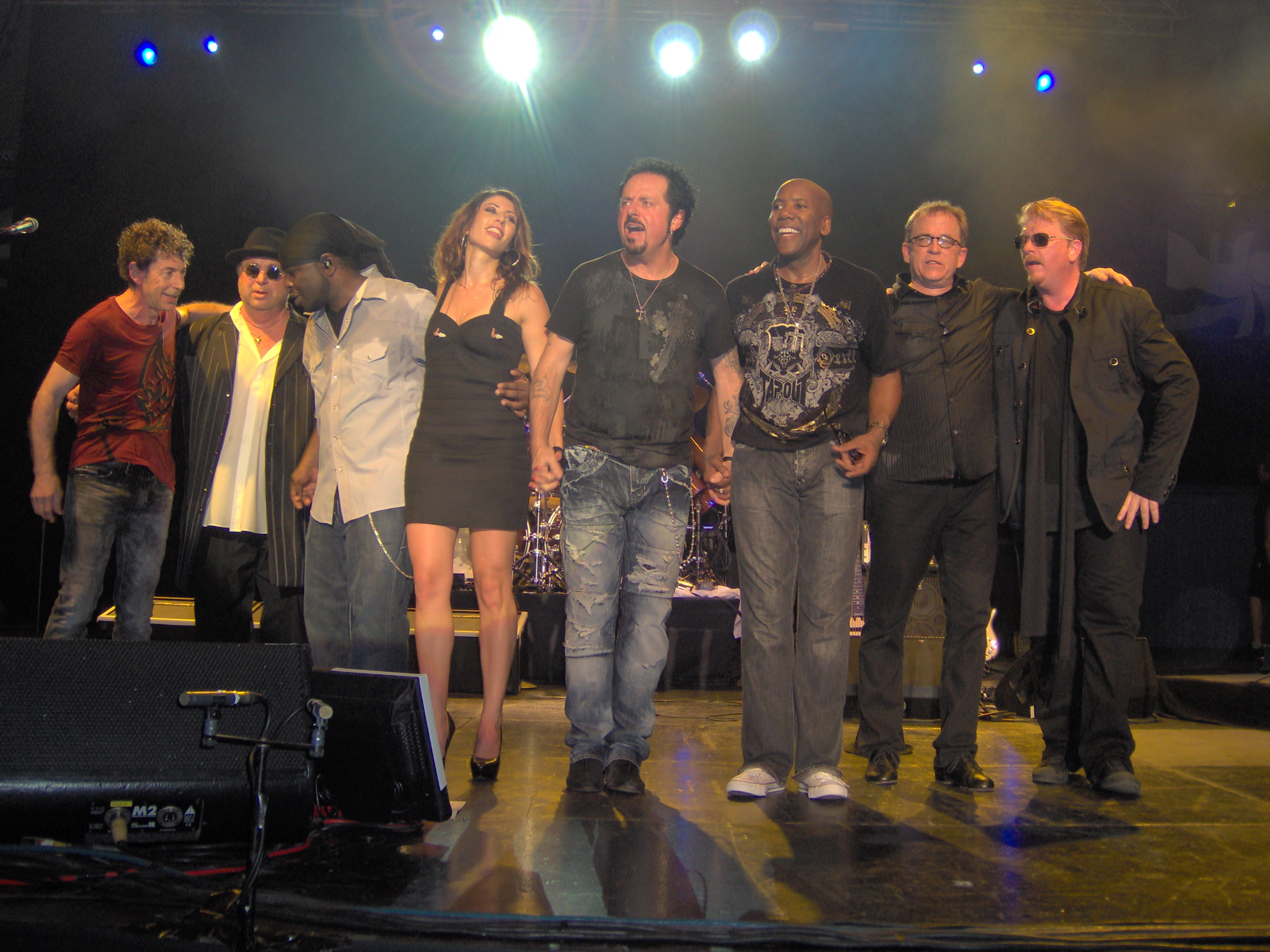
Toto (band pictured in 2010) had two number-one singles in 1983 with "I Won't Hold You Back" and "Waiting for Your Love".

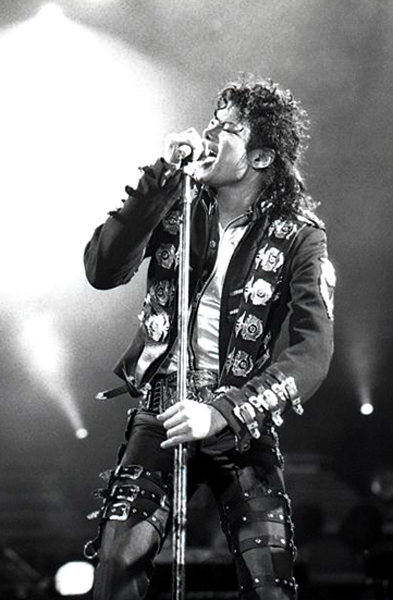
Michael Jackson spent two weeks at number one with "Human Nature".

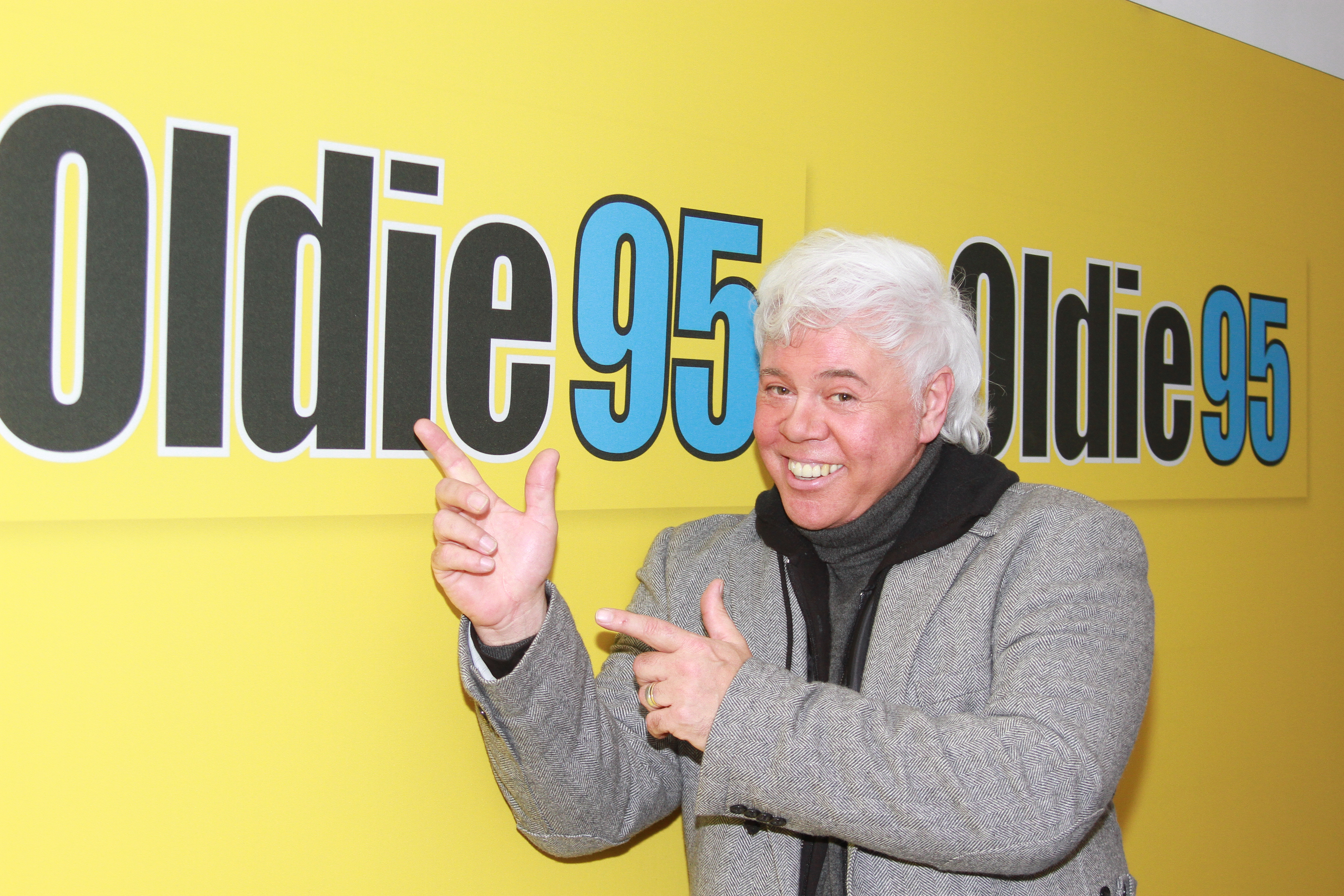
Dutch-Indonesian musician Taco (pictured in 2012) topped the charts with covers of "Puttin' On the Ritz" and "Singin' in the Rain".

An asterisk (*) indicates an unpublished weekly chart due to the special double issues RPM publishes for the year-end top singles charts.

Chart history
Issue date	Title	Artist(s)	Ref.
January 1*	"You and I"	Eddie Rabbitt and Crystal Gayle	
January 8*	"You and I"	Eddie Rabbitt and Crystal Gayle	
January 15	"It's Raining Again"	Supertramp	
January 22	"Too Beautiful to Cry"	Ronnie Milsap	
January 29	"On the Wings of Love"	Jeffrey Osborne	
February 5	"Someone's Already Saying Goodbye"	Anne Murray	
February 12	"Maneater"	Hall & Oates	
February 19	"You Are"	Lionel Richie	
February 26	"You Are"	Lionel Richie	
March 5	"Shame on the Moon"	Bob Seger	
March 12	"Heart to Heart"	Kenny Loggins	
March 19	"We've Got Tonight"	Kenny Rogers and Sheena Easton	
March 26	"We've Got Tonight"	Kenny Rogers and Sheena Easton	
April 2	"All Right"	Christopher Cross	
April 9	"I'm Alive"	Neil Diamond	
April 16	"Midnight Blue"	Louise Tucker	
April 23	"Make Love Stay"	Dan Fogelberg	
April 30	"It Might Be You"	Stephen Bishop	
May 7	"Take the Short Way Home"	Dionne Warwick	
May 14	"Somebody Loves You"	Kamahl	
May 21	"I Won't Hold You Back"	Toto	
May 28	"Puttin' On the Ritz"	Taco	
June 4	"Puttin' On the Ritz"	Taco	
June 11	"My Love"	Lionel Richie	
June 18	"Flashdance... What a Feeling"	Irene Cara	
June 25	"Flashdance... What a Feeling"	Irene Cara	
July 2	"Flashdance... What a Feeling"	Irene Cara	
July 9	"Flashdance... What a Feeling"	Irene Cara	
July 16	"Flashdance... What a Feeling"	Irene Cara	
July 23	"The Woman in You"	Bee Gees	^{[A]}
July 30	"Straight from the Heart"	Bryan Adams	
August 6	"The Closer You Get"	Alabama	
August 13	"Hold Me 'til the Mornin' Comes"	Paul Anka	
August 20	"The Border"	America	
August 27	"All Time High"	Rita Coolidge	
September 3	"Waiting for Your Love"	Toto	
September 10	"Stand By"	Roman Holliday	
September 17	"How Am I Supposed to Live Without You"	Laura Branigan	
September 24	"Human Nature"	Michael Jackson	
October 1	"Human Nature"	Michael Jackson	
October 8	"Singin' in the Rain"	Taco	
October 15	"Maniac"	Michael Sembello	
October 22	"Making Love Out of Nothing at All"	Air Supply	
October 29	"Telefone (Long Distance Love Affair)"	Sheena Easton	
November 5	"Telefone (Long Distance Love Affair)"	Sheena Easton	
November 12	"All Night Long (All Night)"	Lionel Richie	
November 19	"All Night Long (All Night)"	Lionel Richie	
November 26	"Islands in the Stream"	Kenny Rogers and Dolly Parton	
December 3	"Uptown Girl"	Billy Joel	
December 10	"Uptown Girl"	Billy Joel	
December 17	"The Way He Makes Me Feel"	Barbra Streisand	
December 24	"The Way He Makes Me Feel"	Barbra Streisand	
December 31	"What's New"	Linda Ronstadt	

^{A} Due to a publishing error, this chart was dated June 23, 1983.
