= Midnight blue (disambiguation) =

Midnight blue is a dark blue color.

Midnight blue may also refer to:

== Film and television ==
- Midnight Blue (TV series), a 1974–2003 sexually themed show in New York City, hosted by Al Goldstein
- "Midnight Blue" (Terrahawks), a 1984 television episode
- Midnight Blue, a 1997 film starring Damian Chapa

== Music ==
- Midnight Blue, a 1980s melodic rock band featuring vocalist Doogie White

=== Albums ===
- Midnight Blue (Graham Collier album) or the title song, 1975
- Midnight Blue (Kenny Burrell album) or the title song, 1963
- Midnight Blue (Louise Tucker album) or the title song (see below), 1982
- Midnight Blue (Love Streaming), a single album by B.I, 2021
- Midnight Blue, by Twiggy, 2003

=== Songs ===
- "Midnight Blue" (Lou Gramm song), 1987
- "Midnight Blue" (Louise Tucker song), 1982
- "Midnight Blue" (Megumi Hayashibara song), 1995
- "Midnight Blue" (Melissa Manchester song), 1975
- "Midnight Blue", by Alkaline Trio from My Shame Is True, 2013
- "Midnight Blue", by Electric Light Orchestra from Discovery, 1979
- "Midnight Blue", by Enya, a B-side of the single "Wild Child", 2001

== Other uses ==
- Midnight Blue (cheese) or Aura, a brand of blue cheese made by the Finnish company Valio
- Midnight blue belt, a dan rank belt in some Korean martial arts

== See also ==
- "Midnight Blues", a song by Super Junior from Mamacita, 2014
