= Toto IV =

Studio album by Toto
- Released: March 29, 1982
- Recorded: June 1981 – January 1982
- Studios: Sunset Sound (Hollywood); Record One (Los Angeles); Strings recorded at Abbey Road (London); Additional recording at Hogg Manor (Los Angeles)
- Genres: AOR; pop rock; soft rock; hard rock; R&B
- Length: 41:58
- Label: Columbia
- Producer: Toto

Toto chronology
Turn Back (1981)	Toto IV (1982)	Isolation (1984)

Singles from Toto IV
- 1. "Rosanna" Released: March 1982; 2. "Africa" Released: June 1982 (UK); 3. "Make Believe" Released: July 1982 (US); 4. "Afraid of Love" Released: 1982 (Japan); 5. "I Won't Hold You Back" Released: October 1982; 6. "Waiting for Your Love" Released: June 1983

Professional ratings
Review scores
Source	Rating
AllMusic	4.5/5 stars
Robert Christgau	B−
Rolling Stone	2/5 stars

Toto IV is the fourth studio album by American rock band Toto, released on March 29, 1982, by Columbia Records. The album's lead single, "Rosanna", peaked at number 2 for five weeks on the Billboard Hot 100 charts, while the album's third single, "Africa", topping the Hot 100 chart, became the group's first and only number 1 hit. Both songs were hits in the UK as well, reaching number 12 and 3, respectively. The fourth single, "I Won't Hold You Back", also peaked within the top ten on the Hot 100, at number 10 and atop the Billboard Adult Contemporary charts for three weeks. It also went into the top 40 in the UK. With the success of "Africa", the album climbed back into the top 10 in early 1983 on both sides of the Atlantic.

Toto IV received six Grammy Awards in 1983 including Album of the Year, Producer of the Year for the band, and Record of the Year for "Rosanna". It reached number four on the Billboard 200 album charts in the United States, shortly after its release. It also reached the top ten in other countries, including Canada, Australia, New Zealand, the Netherlands, Italy, Norway, the United Kingdom, and Japan. It was also the last Toto album to feature their original bassist David Hungate until his return in 2014 (with the release of their 2015 album Toto XIV) when he was replaced by Mike Porcaro after the band's recording of the album, and also the final album to feature original lead vocalist Bobby Kimball until his comeback in 1998 (with the release of the 1999 album Mindfields).

== Background ==
After the success of their self-titled debut, Toto struggled to sustain success on their next two albums, Hydra and Turn Back. The band was under heavy pressure from Columbia Records to deliver a hit album with their next release or be at risk of being dropped from the label.

The band went back to the formula that helped them succeed on their first album, having an album that touched on many different genres of music. They also utilized many outside musicians to help give the sound a more polished, fuller feel than they had on past albums.

This was the final album with the original Toto lineup, as bassist David Hungate, who moved to Nashville during the recording of the album, left the band to spend more time with his family: Jeff and Steve Porcaro's brother Mike, who played cello on "Good for You", would soon replace Hungate as the band's new official bassist. Two years later, shortly after beginning recording of their follow-up album, Bobby Kimball was fired by the band due to drug issues that were damaging his voice.

The band delayed touring after the release of the album to instead help in the production of Michael Jackson's Thriller album, as well as collaborating on Chicago's comeback album Chicago 16 that same year.

== Production ==
Recording took place across several months in 1981 and 1982, and the band was allowed a much larger than average recording budget. At a time when most bands were using a single 24-track recorder, Toto used as many as three separate 24-track recorders simultaneously.

The multiple 24-track recorders were linked via a computerized SMPTE timecode system. One track of each machine contained the timecode synchronization signal, while 22 of the remaining 23 tracks of each reel were available for audio track recordings. (Typically, on analog 24-track recorders SMPTE was recorded on track 24, and the track next to it left blank to avoid any cross-talk or bleed over from the time code.) A significant number of tracks were copied and mixed down from those already recorded on another synchronized tape reel. This process lowered the amount of wear on the first generation tapes and helped maintain high quality sound during the extensive overdubbing and mixing process.

== Cover art ==
Philip Garris's original emblem from the Toto album was updated to show four rings since this was their fourth album. The newer looking, well-polished ring around the hilt of the sword represented their latest work. Each successive ring showed a little more wear and a few more chips which represented the band's previous records.

== Track listing ==
Side one
No.	Title	Writer(s)	Lead vocals	Length
1.	"Rosanna"	David Paich	Lukather, Kimball	5:32
2.	"Make Believe"	Paich	Kimball	3:43
3.	"I Won't Hold You Back"	Lukather	Lukather	4:56
4.	"Good for You"	Lukather; Kimball	Kimball	3:18
5.	"It's a Feeling"	Steve Porcaro	S. Porcaro	3:06

Side two
No.	Title	Writer(s)	Lead vocals	Length
6.	"Afraid of Love"	Lukather; Paich; Jeff Porcaro	Lukather	3:52
7.	"Lovers in the Night"	Paich	Paich	4:27
8.	"We Made It"	Paich; J. Porcaro	Kimball	3:56
9.	"Waiting for Your Love"	Kimball; Paich	Kimball	4:13
10.	"Africa"	Paich; J. Porcaro	Paich (verse), Kimball (chorus)	4:55
Total length:				41:58

== Personnel ==
Adapted from the album's liner notes.

=== Toto ===
- Bobby Kimball – lead vocals (1, 2, 4, 8–10), backing vocals (1–4, 6–10)
- Steve Lukather – guitars, piano (4), lead vocals (1, 3, 6), backing vocals (1–3, 6–10)
- David Paich – piano, keyboards, organ, lead vocals (7, 10), backing vocals (1, 2, 5–10), horn arrangements (1), orchestral arrangements (3, 5–7)
- Steve Porcaro – keyboards, synthesizers, lead vocals (5)
- David Hungate – bass
- Jeff Porcaro – drums, percussion

==== Additional musicians ====
- Lenny Castro – congas and percussion (1, 4, 5, 7, 10)
- Tom Scott – saxophone (1, 7)
- Jim Horn – saxophone (1, 7), recorders (10)
- Jerry Hey – trumpet, horn arrangements (1)
- Gary Grant – trumpet (1)
- Jimmy Pankow – trombone (1)
- Tom Kelly – backing vocals (1, 2)
- Jon Smith – saxophone (2)
- Timothy B. Schmit – backing vocals (3, 4, 10), 12-string acoustic guitar (10)
- The Martyn Ford Orchestra – strings (3, 5–7)
- James Newton Howard – conductor and orchestral arrangements (3, 5–7)
- Marty Paich – orchestral arrangements (3)
- Mike Porcaro – cello (4)
- Roger Linn – synthesizer programming (4)
- Joe Porcaro – percussion (5, 10), xylophone (6), timpani (7), marimba (10)
- Ralph Dyck – synthesizers (7)

=== Technical ===
- Produced by Toto
- Mixed by Greg Ladanyi
- Engineered by Al Schmitt (1, 3–5, 7, 10), Tom Knox (2, 9), and Greg Ladanyi (6, 8)
- Mastered by George Marino at Sterling Sound, New York
- Additional recording (at Sunset Sound) – David Leonard, Peggy McCreary, and Terry Christian
- Additional recording (at Record One) – Jamie Ledner, Niko Bolas, and Lon LeMaster
- Additional recording (at Hogg Manor) – David Paich, Steve Porcaro, Dick Gall, and Bruce Heigh
- Orchestra recording (at Abbey Road) – John Kurlander (3, 5–7)
- Mastered by Doug Sax at The Mastering Lab, Los Angeles, CA
- Album package concept – Jeff Porcaro
- Illustration – Joe Spencer
- Photography – Sam Emerson, Glen Christensen, Jim Hagopian

== Charts ==
=== Weekly charts ===
Weekly chart performance for Toto IV
Chart (1982–1983)	Peak position
Australian Kent Music Report Albums Chart	1
Canadian Albums Chart	1
Dutch Mega Albums Chart	1
French SNEP Albums Chart	16
German Media Control Albums Chart	12
Japanese Oricon LP Chart	3
New Zealand Albums Chart	9
Norwegian VG-lista Albums Chart	2
Swedish Albums Chart	17
UK Albums Chart	4
US Billboard 200	4

=== Year-end charts ===
Year-end chart performance for Toto IV
Chart (1982)	Position
Canadian Albums Chart	60
Dutch Albums Chart	10
French Albums Chart	21
German Albums (Offizielle Top 100)	16
New Zealand Albums (RMNZ)	36
US Billboard 200	41
Chart (1983)	Position
Australian Albums Chart	21
Canadian Albums Chart	16
German Albums (Offizielle Top 100)	46
UK Albums Chart	39
US Billboard 200	11

== Certifications and sales ==
Certifications for Toto IV
Region	Certification	Certified units/sales
Australia (ARIA)	2× Platinum	140,000^{‡}
Canada (Music Canada)	2× Platinum	200,000^{^}
Denmark (IFPI Danmark)	Gold	10,000^{‡}
Finland (Musiikkituottajat)	Gold	34,179
France (SNEP)	Platinum	300,000^{*}
Germany (BVMI)	Platinum	500,000^{^}
Hong Kong (IFPI Hong Kong)	Gold	10,000^{*}
Japan (RIAJ)	Platinum	346,520
Netherlands (NVPI)	Platinum	100,000^{^}
New Zealand (RMNZ)	Gold	7,500^{^}
United Kingdom (BPI)	Gold	100,000^{^}
United States (RIAA)	4× Platinum	4,000,000^{‡}
^{*} Sales figures based on certification alone.^{^} Shipments figures based on certification alone.^{‡} Sales+streaming figures based on certification alone.
