= List of number-one singles of 1983 (Canada) =

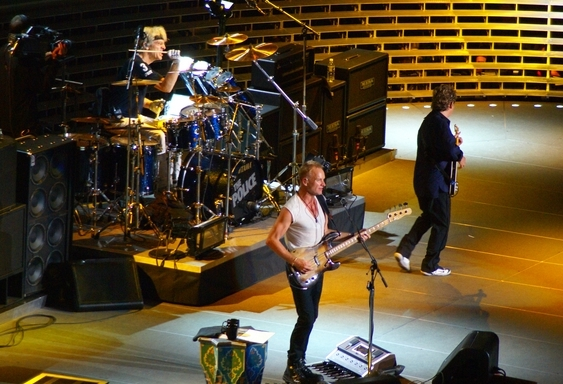
The Police released the most successful single of 1983: "Every Breath You Take".

RPM was a Canadian magazine that published the best-performing singles of Canada from 1964 to 2000. During 1983, twenty-seven singles became number-one hits in Canada. Toni Basil commenced the year with her single "Mickey" while Paul McCartney and Michael Jackson's "Say Say Say" was 1983's final number one. Those who had previously reached number one on Canada's chart were Marvin Gaye, Michael Jackson, Styx, The Police, Elton John, Bonnie Tyler, Kenny Rogers, Dolly Parton, Lionel Richie, and Paul McCartney. No Canadians reached the summit in 1983.

The most successful artist of the year based on the number of chart-toppers and weeks spent at number one was Michael Jackson. He gained his first Canadian number-one hit this year with "Billie Jean" in March, then attained the chart's top position three more times with "Beat It" in May, "Wanna Be Startin' Somethin'" in July, and "Say Say Say" in December. In total, Jackson remained at number one for 10 weeks during 1983. Despite this success, it was British band The Police that achieved the best-performing hit of 1983, "Every Breath You Take", which stayed at number one on the issues of 2 July and 9 July.

Alongside Jackson, The Police were also the only act to peak at number one more than once, rising to the top again in October with "King of Pain". Together with "Every Breath You Take", the band remained at number one for three issues. Toni Basil's "Mickey", Musical Youth's "Pass the Dutchie", Michael Jackson's "Beat It", Irene Cara's "Flashdance... What a Feeling", Michael Sembello's "Maniac", Lionel Richie's "All Night Long (All Night)", and Paul McCartney and Michael Jackson's "Say Say Say" were the seven tracks that stayed at number one for at least three weeks.

Key
† Indicates best-performing single of 1983

== Chart history ==
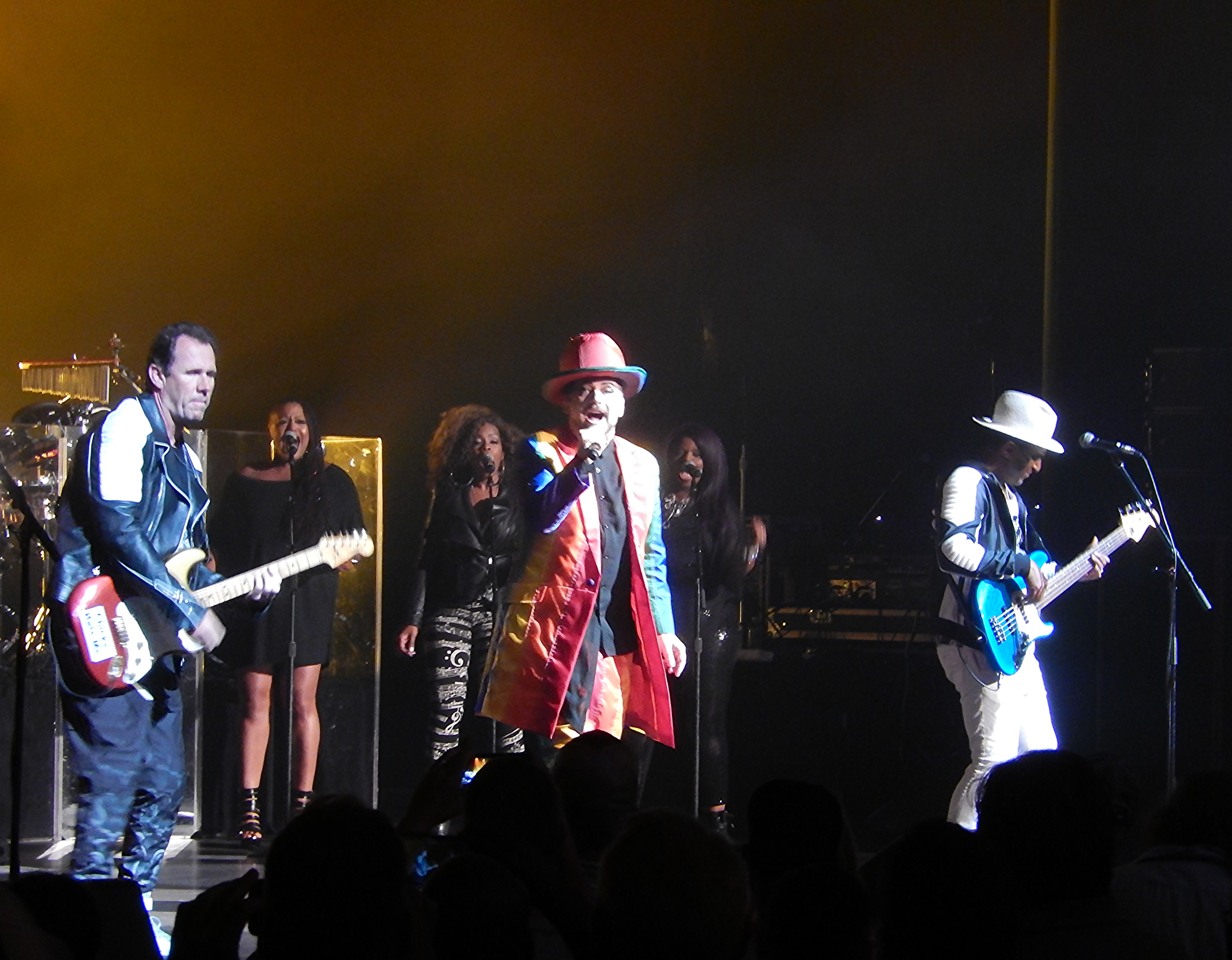
Culture Club's "Do You Really Want to Hurt Me" became their first Canadian number-one hit in March.

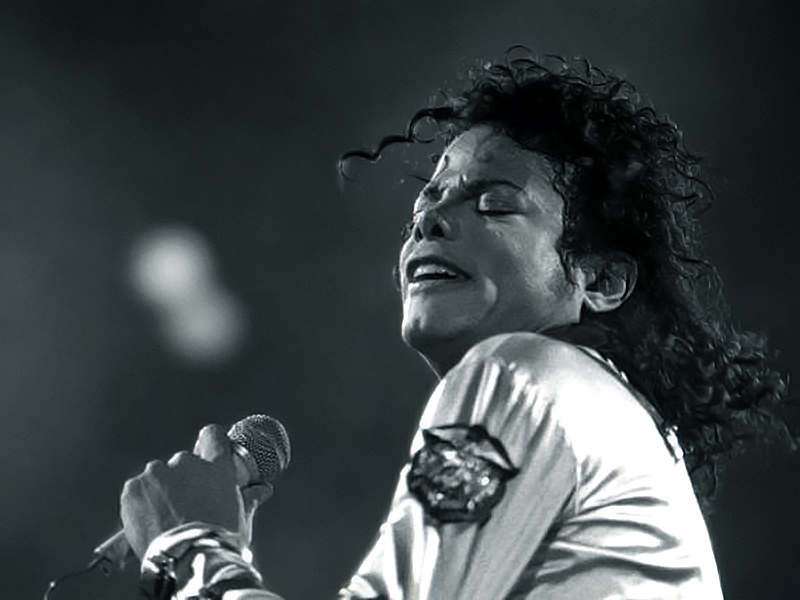
Michael Jackson picked up four Canadian number-one hits in 1983: "Billie Jean", "Beat It", "Wanna Be Startin' Somethin'", and "Say Say Say", spending a total of 10 weeks at the top.

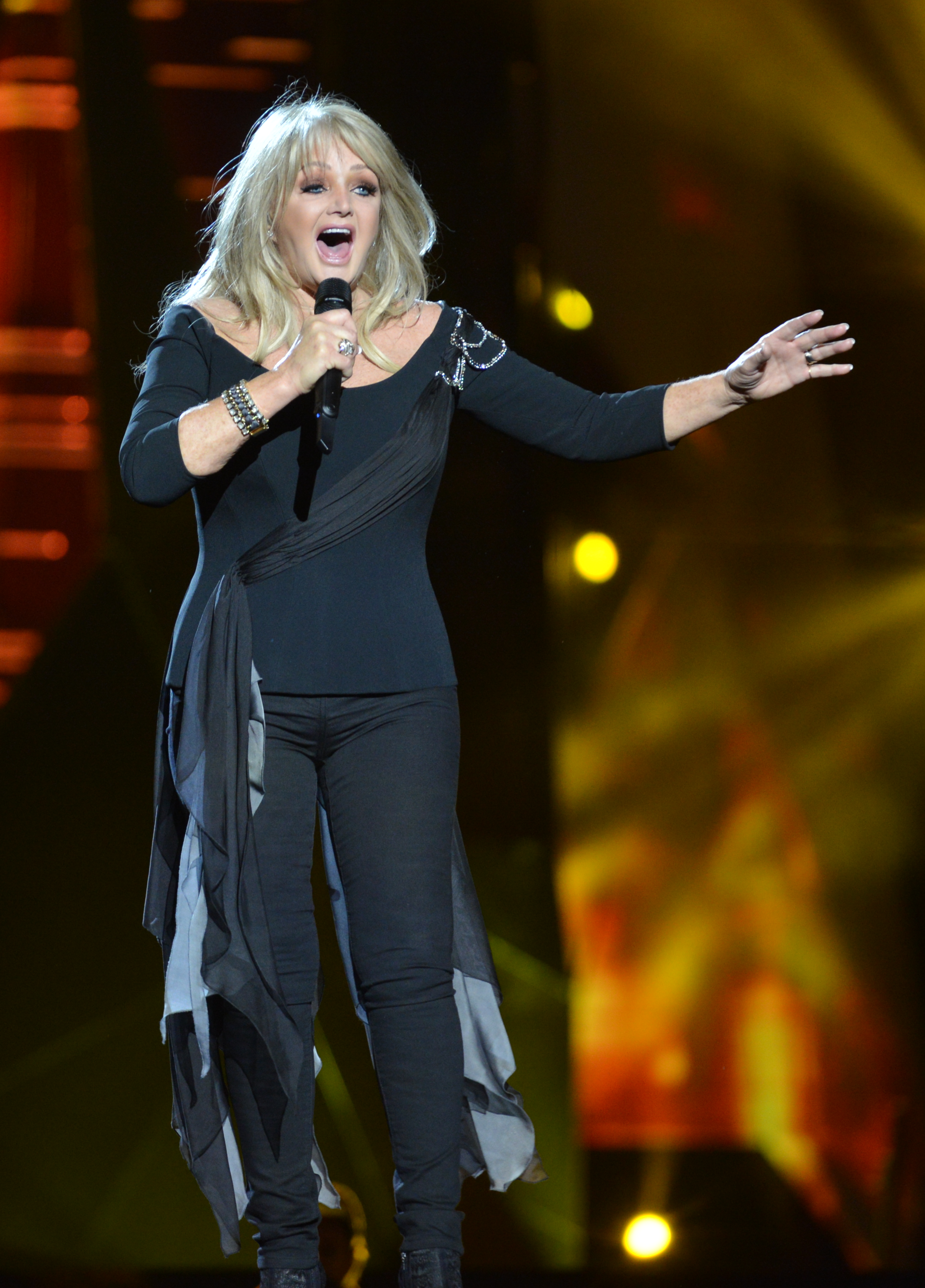
Welsh singer Bonnie Tyler held the number-one position for two weeks with "Total Eclipse of the Heart".

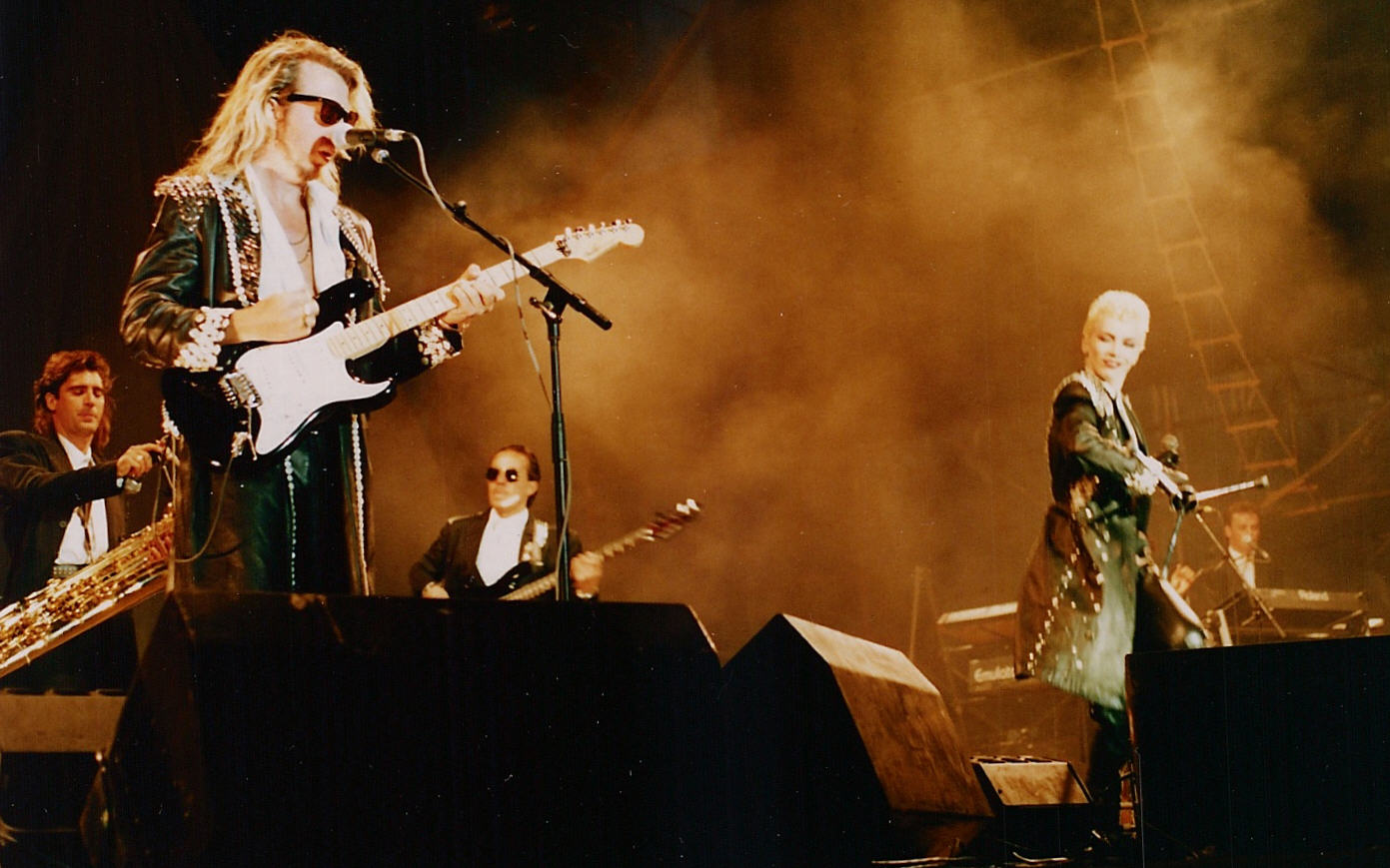
Pop duo Eurythmics rose to number one in September with "Sweet Dreams (Are Made of This)".

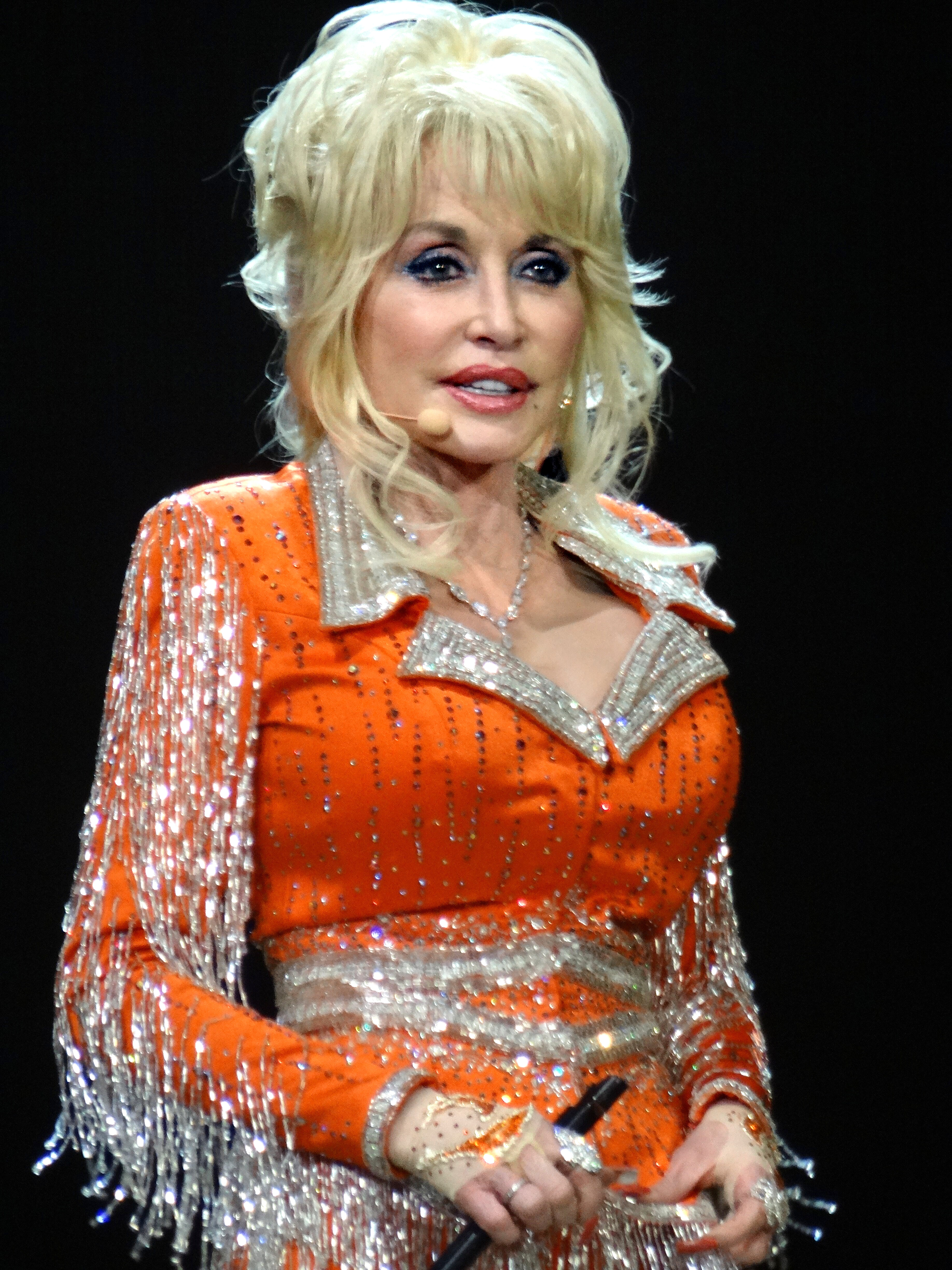
Dolly Parton (pictured) duetted with Kenny Rogers on "Islands in the Stream", which stayed at number one for two weeks.

Issue date	Song	Artist	Reference
1 January (Note: Due to a two-week break in publication over the 1982/1983 New Year period, the weeks of 1 January and 8 January are inferred.)	"Mickey"	Toni Basil	
8 January	"Mickey"	Toni Basil	
15 January	"Mickey"	Toni Basil	
22 January	"Pass the Dutchie"	Musical Youth	
29 January	"Pass the Dutchie"	Musical Youth	
5 February	"Pass the Dutchie"	Musical Youth	
12 February	"Africa"	Toto	
19 February	"Sexual Healing"	Marvin Gaye	
26 February	"Sexual Healing"	Marvin Gaye	
5 March	"Do You Really Want to Hurt Me"	Culture Club	
12 March	"Do You Really Want to Hurt Me"	Culture Club	
19 March	"Hungry Like the Wolf"	Duran Duran	
26 March	"Billie Jean"	Michael Jackson	
2 April	"Billie Jean"	Michael Jackson	
9 April	"Mr. Roboto"	Styx	
16 April	"Mr. Roboto"	Styx	
23 April	"She Blinded Me with Science"	Thomas Dolby	
30 April	"She Blinded Me with Science"	Thomas Dolby	
7 May	"Let's Dance"	David Bowie	
14 May	"Beat It"	Michael Jackson	
21 May	"Beat It"	Michael Jackson	
28 May	"Beat It"	Michael Jackson	
4 June	"Flashdance... What a Feeling"	Irene Cara	
11 June	"Flashdance... What a Feeling"	Irene Cara	
18 June	"Flashdance... What a Feeling"	Irene Cara	
25 June	"Electric Avenue"	Eddy Grant	
2 July	"Every Breath You Take"†	The Police	
9 July	"Every Breath You Take"†	The Police	
16 July	"I'm Still Standing"	Elton John	
23 July	"Wanna Be Startin' Somethin'"	Michael Jackson	
30 July	"Wanna Be Startin' Somethin'"	Michael Jackson	
6 August	"White Wedding"	Billy Idol	
13 August	"Total Eclipse of the Heart"	Bonnie Tyler	
20 August	"Total Eclipse of the Heart"	Bonnie Tyler	
27 August	"Our House"	Madness	
3 September	"Our House"	Madness	
10 September	"Sweet Dreams (Are Made of This)"	Eurythmics	
17 September	"Sweet Dreams (Are Made of This)"	Eurythmics	
24 September	"Maniac"	Michael Sembello	
1 October	"Maniac"	Michael Sembello	
8 October	"Maniac"	Michael Sembello	
15 October	"King of Pain"	The Police	
22 October	"One Thing Leads to Another"	The Fixx	
29 October	"True"	Spandau Ballet	
5 November	"True"	Spandau Ballet	
12 November	"Islands in the Stream"	Kenny Rogers and Dolly Parton	
19 November	"Islands in the Stream"	Kenny Rogers and Dolly Parton	
26 November	"All Night Long (All Night)"	Lionel Richie	
3 December	"All Night Long (All Night)"	Lionel Richie	
10 December	"All Night Long (All Night)"	Lionel Richie	
17 December	"Say Say Say"	Paul McCartney and Michael Jackson	
24 December	"Say Say Say"	Paul McCartney and Michael Jackson	
31 December	"Say Say Say"	Paul McCartney and Michael Jackson	

== See also ==
- 1983 in music
- List of RPM number-one adult contemporary singles of 1983
- List of RPM number-one country singles of 1983
- List of Billboard Hot 100 number ones of 1983
- List of Cashbox Top 100 number-one singles of 1983
- List of Canadian number-one albums of 1983
