= Make Believe (Toto song) =

Single by Toto

from the album Toto IV
- B-side: "We Made It" (US); "Lovers in the Night" (Netherlands)
- Released: July 1982 (US); October 22, 1982 (UK)
- Recorded: 1981
- Genre: Hard rock; pop rock; jazz rock; yacht rock
- Length: 3:43
- Label: Columbia
- Songwriter: David Paich
- Producer: Toto

Toto singles chronology
"Rosanna" (1982)	"Make Believe" (1982)	"Africa" (1982)

"Make Believe" is a song by the American rock band Toto, released as the second single (third in Europe) from their triple platinum 1982 album Toto IV. It peaked at number 19 in Cash Box magazine and at number 30 on the Billboard Hot 100 chart on September 25, 1982.

== Critical reception ==
Cashbox called it "sunny summer pop that should reach the top," saying that "the opening piano chords recall The Beach Boys." Billboard described it as a "hard-edged yet downtempo love song," saying "Piano triplets point to '50s rock classics, while synthesizer and buzzsaw guitar accents underline its contemporary vintage." Robin Smith of Record Mirror wrote that the song "echoes the success of 'Hold the Line' with its pungent keyboards and pleading vocals."

== Personnel ==
Taken from the Toto IV liner notes.

Toto

- Bobby Kimball – lead and backing vocals
- Steve Lukather – guitars, backing vocals
- David Paich – keyboards, backing vocals
- Steve Porcaro – keyboards
- David Hungate – bass
- Jeff Porcaro – drums, percussion

Additional musicians

- Tom Kelly – backing vocals
- Jon Smith – saxophone

Production

- Tom Knox – recording engineer

== Charts ==
Chart performance for "Make Believe"
Chart (1982)	Peak position
Germany (GfK)	70
US Billboard Hot 100	30
