= Midnight Blue (Louise Tucker album) =

Studio album by Louise Tucker
- Released: 1982
- Recorded: 1982
- Genre: Synthpop, classical crossover
- Label: Arista (US) / Ariola Records (Europe)
- Producer: Charlie Skarbek

Midnight Blue is the title of Louise Tucker's 1982 debut album.

Total sales for the lead single, "Midnight Blue", and the resultant album totaled seven million.

Midnight Blue reached number 1 in France and number 1 in Canada, and in various countries around the world. The title track was the 51st biggest single of 1983 in the Canadian charts. The album was released on CD in 1990.

Music is from composer Ludwig van Beethoven Sonata No. 8 Op. 13 (Pathetique)

== Track listing ==
1. "Midnight Blue"
2. "Only for You"
3. "Hush"
4. "Shadows"
5. "Waiting for Hugo"
6. "Voices in the Wind"
7. "Jerusalem"
8. "Graveyard Angel"
9. "Gettin' Older"

== Charts ==
Chart (1983)	Peak position
Australia (Kent Music Report)	72
