= I'll Supply the Love =

Single by Toto

from the album Toto
- B-side: "You Are the Flower"
- Released: January 1979
- Recorded: 1978
- Genre: Hard rock; funk rock
- Length: 3:45
- Label: Columbia
- Songwriter: David Paich
- Producer: Toto

Toto singles chronology
"Hold the Line" (1978)	"I'll Supply the Love" (1979)	"Georgy Porgy" (1979)

"I'll Supply the Love" is a song written by David Paich and recorded by Toto, with lead vocals by Bobby Kimball. It was issued on the band's eponymous debut album, and released as a single in January 1979. It peaked at number 45 on the U.S. Billboard Hot 100, where it spent nine weeks on the chart.

Internationally, the song reached No. 92 in Australia, No. 73 in Canada, and No. 29 in New Zealand.

== Critical reception ==
Cash Box said it has "power guitar chords, rhythmic changes, impassioned singing and strong chorus." Billboard said that "David Paich's knack for writing great hooks is evident in this uptempo rocker which features tasty instrumentation and high vocals." Record World called it a "sterling effort" with "brisk chording and vocals."

Classic Rock History critic Brian Kachejian rated it as Toto's sixth greatest song, calling it a "knockout song."

== Personnel ==
Adapted from the album's liner notes.

=== Toto ===
- Bobby Kimball – lead and backing vocals
- Steve Lukather – guitars, backing vocals
- David Paich – piano, organ, backing vocals
- Steve Porcaro – synthesizers
- David Hungate – bass
- Jeff Porcaro – drums

=== Additional musicians ===
- Lenny Castro – percussion
- Chuck Findley – trumpet

=== Production ===
- Dana Latham – recording/tracking
- Gabe Veltri – recording/tracking
- Tom Knox – mixing
- Mike Reese – mastering
- Ron Hitchcock – mastering

== Release history ==
Region	Date	Ref.
United States	January 1979	
Europe	March 1979	
United Kingdom	April 27, 1979	
