= Jean-Michel Byron =

South African vocalist, songwriter (born 1957)

- Byron in the 2000s

Background information
- Born: Jean-Michel Byron du Plessis; October 13, 1957 (age 69); East London, Cape Province, Union of South Africa
- Genres: Funk; pop rock
- Occupations: Vocalist, songwriter
- Instrument: Vocals
- Years active: 1983–present
- Formerly of: Toto

Jean-Michel Byron du Plessis (born October 13, 1957) is a South African singer and songwriter, best known for serving as the lead vocalist of the rock band Toto from 1990 until 1991. Byron's only recordings with the band are four tracks that first appeared on the compilation album Past to Present (1990). He was the fourth frontman in the band's history, replacing Joseph Williams after Williams had suffered from voice issues after touring, stemming from drug abuse. Byron was pushed heavily by the group's record label. The line-up change divided Toto's principal members, with founder Jeff Porcaro initially expressing his support. His tenure with the band ended up being both brief and highly controversial with fans. In more recent years, Byron has collaborated with the jazz fusion group Michael Sanders & the One Tribe Nation.

== Biography and career ==
Byron's musical career began in 1983 as a session singer, having also played in groups doing cover songs. Originally from KuGompo City, South Africa, he attended high school (senior secondary) at John Bissicker High School in a former "coloured area". He sang at high school concerts and community shows.

Byron joined Toto for their Past to Present 1977–1990 album. Singing on the release's four new tracks, including the song "Can You Hear What I'm Saying", Byron possessed a distinct R&B influence separate from group's past vocalists, drawing from artists such as George Michael. The album, released in mid-1990, reached the top 20 on album charts in nations including Germany and Switzerland. However, reviewers had mixed remarks on Byron's vocal abilities, with AllMusic's William Ruhlmann finding Byron "more soulful than his predecessors, but no more memorable."

The band's record label had strongly pushed Byron on the other band members, who felt uncertain given the difference of styles between Byron's soul music background and Toto's previous rock work. Despite initial success, tensions rose during the album's supporting tour in 1990, when Byron and the band began to openly clash. His on-stage antics and "diva-like" behavior irked other band members and had a strongly polarizing influence on Toto's fans.

So we go on the road and the very first night -- it was in Brussels, I’ll never forget this -- Byron comes out and starts dancing around. I’m looking at Jeff [Porcaro] with bulging eyes. In rehearsal, Byron was just sitting there, but now he’s out doing this Michael Jackson on crack s---, with a golf glove on one hand, and my jaw was on the floor. There’s people in the front row, flipping him off -- “Get off the stage!” We’re mortified. We tell the guy, “Look, you can’t do this,” but it had all gone to his head; he accused us of not understanding his vision. I said, “No, I understand your f---in’ vision, it’s just the wrong one.” We just did not get on at all.

— Steve Lukather

Late in 1990, the group hired backup singers Jenny Douglas-Foote and Jacci McGhee-Peoples to stand alongside Byron, while Steve Lukather took on a more prominent vocal role. Byron was progressively relegated to the role of a backing vocalist. Byron was dismissed from Toto in 1991 and replaced by backing vocalist Fred White.

Fans' animosity towards Byron had built up to the point that all of his songs were cut from the filmed Toto Live video from the aforementioned tour. After being kicked out of Toto, Byron released a solo album, simply titled Byron, which contains an alternate version of "Love Has the Power".

More recently, Byron has collaborated with the group "Michael Sanders & the One Tribe Nation", a band playing a mix of jazz rock with funk, world music, and more, and he appeared on the outfit's 2005 debut album Servants of a Lesser God. With Byron's material alongside works by Luis Conte and Andy Vargas of Santana among others, the release has received positive remarks from several critics such as Morley Seaver of antimusic.com, who praised the "hypnotic blend of musical virtuosity and melodic ear-pleasers" on the album.

Byron also contributed to the Star Jasmine Music Foundation project's 2007 release, titled simply Star Jasmine, with his material alongside songs performed by artists such as Ginger Baker and Van Morrison. His song was called "For a Dancer". The charitable organization assists Californians in many ways such as operating "JAMS", a volunteer-run music school giving instruments and lessons to at-risk youths in the Santa Barbara area.

From 2015 to 2023 they collaborated with the Italian guitarist Ivan Margari with the project SLO Express Band and Jean Michel Byron & Ivan Margari Music. Together they were guests and judges in the 2020 final of the Sanremo Rock Festival.[1] and in 2023 of the Ischia Global Film & Music Festival, also participating in several RAI broadcasts (Paradise-Una Finestra sullo Showbiz - Raidue by Pascal Vicedomini) and Felicità (Raidue). In the same year they played themselves in the final scene in the film "Amici per Caso" by Max Nardari. They recorded a series of songs that have never been released.

In 2021 he was on the jury for the regional finals of the Italian music talent format Sanremo Rock, during which he performed in a live jam session with Nora Hime, art name of Eleonora Almonti, front of the winning Italian band Tothem.

== Highlighted discography ==
- 1990 – Past to Present / Toto (vocals, composition)
- 2005 – Servants of a Lesser God / Michael Sanders & the One Tribe Nation (vocals)
