= Charlie Skarbek =

British musician (born 1953)

Charlie Skarbek (born Charles John Skarbek, December 1953) is a singer, record producer, composer and lyricist. He has worked with many celebrated musicians from both the classical and popular fields.

== General ==
In the late seventies, Charlie Skarbek formed a band, 'Soho', with Tim Smit.

Despite flourishing as composer / lyricist from circa 1985 to date, there is little biographical detail available on Skarbek. He has been one of the more significant éminences grises in British popular music. He never features as principal performer, but his name nevertheless appears in the credits for numerous tracks and albums in this time. His particular speciality, of putting pop lyrics to famous classical musical themes and hymn tunes, may offend purists. However, it has brought awareness of this music to millions (see references to classical pieces in the list below). He is also noted for providing 'anthems' relating to sporting events.

== "World in Union" ==
He is perhaps best known for the lyrics he set to music originally from the central section of Jupiter, the fourth movement from Gustav Holst's suite The Planets to create "World in Union". The tune, also known as "Thaxted", had previously been used for the patriotic song "I Vow to Thee, My Country" and in various other word-settings.

Skarbek made this setting in response to a commission by World Rugby for the World Cup in 1991 and it has been used as the tournament's anthem on many occasions since. Dame Kiri Te Kanawa recorded the first version of this song for the 1991 Rugby World Cup; Shirley Bassey and Bryn Terfel recorded a version in 1999; Hayley Westenra recorded a version for The Rugby World Cup 2011 in New Zealand, and Paloma Faith recorded a version of the song for ITV's coverage of the 2015 Rugby World Cup. It also features in the soundtrack to the film 'Invictus'.

== Selected other works ==
Skarbek's other works include:

- "A Dream Come True" -A cover of Ik hou van jou by Maribelle but with words by Charlie Skarbek, performed by Cilla Black and featured in Black's Through the Years (with Skarbek also on keyboards, production, etc.).
- Anthem (Olé, Olé, Olé, Olé / Aida) Various contributors including Charlie Skarbek (Producer) with The Crowd (Marcel Theunissen, Michel Diederiks, and Patrick de Schrevel)
- "Gloryland" (after the traditional spiritual song Glory, Glory (Lay My Burden Down)- Charlie Skarbek (listed among the lyricists) with Daryl Hall, Sounds of Blackness, and the Swedish hard rock band Glory
- "Midnight Blue" co-written with Tim Smit (after Beethoven's Sonate Pathétique) Charlie Skarbek (producer and vocals) with Louise Tucker
- Olympic Themes 1988 - Olympic Themes by Charlie Skarbek 1988 Seoul Olympics – album of works involving Charlie Skarbek
- "Falling", (after Debussy's "Clair de lune")
- "Give Me Tonight", (after Chopin's "Tristesse" Etude, Op. 10/3)
- "Hold You in My Arms", (after Mozart's Clarinet Concerto)
- "Don't Talk to Me of Love" (duet between Barry Manilow and Mireille Mathieu) (from the French release of "Manilow") 1985; collaboration with Jean Lenoir and Tim Smit
- "Hiding from the Eyes of Love" co-written with Tim Smit for the film Madame Sousatzka
- "Feel the Motion" co-written with Tim Smit for the film Madame Sousatzka
