= List of Canadian number-one albums of 1983 =

These are the Canadian number-one albums of 1983. The charts were compiled and published by RPM every Saturday.

== Number-one albums ==
†	This indicates the best performing album of the year.

Issue date	Album	Artist	Ref
January 1	...Famous Last Words...	Supertramp	
January 8	...Famous Last Words...	Supertramp	
January 15	Business as Usual	Men at Work	
January 22	Business as Usual	Men at Work	
January 29	Business as Usual	Men at Work	
February 5	Hello, I Must Be Going!	Phil Collins	
February 12	Hello, I Must Be Going!	Phil Collins	
February 19	Built for Speed	Stray Cats	
February 26	Built for Speed	Stray Cats	
March 5	Built for Speed	Stray Cats	
March 12	Built for Speed	Stray Cats	
March 19	H_{2}O	Hall & Oates	
March 26	H_{2}O	Hall & Oates	
April 2	Thriller †	Michael Jackson	
April 9	Thriller †	Michael Jackson	
April 16	Rio	Duran Duran	
April 23	Thriller †	Michael Jackson	
April 30	Thriller †	Michael Jackson	
May 7	Thriller †	Michael Jackson	
May 14	Thriller †	Michael Jackson	
May 21	Thriller †	Michael Jackson	
May 28	Thriller †	Michael Jackson	
June 4	Thriller †	Michael Jackson	
June 11	Thriller †	Michael Jackson	
June 18	Thriller †	Michael Jackson	
June 25	Thriller †	Michael Jackson	
July 2	Thriller †	Michael Jackson	
July 9	Thriller †	Michael Jackson	
July 16	Synchronicity	The Police	
July 23	Synchronicity	The Police	
July 30	Synchronicity	The Police	
August 6	Synchronicity	The Police	
August 13	Synchronicity	The Police	
August 20	Synchronicity	The Police	
August 27	Synchronicity	The Police	
September 3	Let's Dance	David Bowie	
September 10	Let's Dance	David Bowie	
September 17	Let's Dance	David Bowie	
September 24	Let's Dance	David Bowie	
October 1	Let's Dance	David Bowie	
October 8	Synchronicity	The Police	
October 15	Synchronicity	The Police	
October 22	Synchronicity	The Police	
October 29	Synchronicity	The Police	
November 5	Synchronicity	The Police	
November 12	Synchronicity	The Police	
November 19	Synchronicity	The Police	
November 26	Synchronicity	The Police	
December 3	Can't Slow Down	Lionel Richie	
December 10	Can't Slow Down	Lionel Richie	
December 17	Can't Slow Down	Lionel Richie	
December 24	Can't Slow Down	Lionel Richie	
December 31	Colour by Numbers	Culture Club	

== See also ==
- List of Canadian number-one singles of 1983
