= Rosanna (song) =

1982 single by Toto

Single by Toto

from the album Toto IV
- B-side: "It's a Feeling"
- Released: March 31, 1982 (US); April 16, 1982 (UK)
- Recorded: 1981
- Studio: Sunset Sound, Hollywood; Record One, Hollywood
- Genre: Soft rock; jazz rock; AOR
- Length: 5:31 (album and video version); 3:59 (single version)
- Label: Columbia
- Songwriter: David Paich
- Producer: Toto

Toto singles chronology
"Live for Today" (1981)	"Rosanna" (1982)	"Make Believe" (1982)

Music video
- "Rosanna" on YouTube

"Rosanna" is a song written by David Paich and performed by the American rock band Toto, and is the opening track and the first single from their 1982 album Toto IV. This song won the Grammy Award for Record of the Year at the 1983 ceremony. "Rosanna" was also nominated for the Song of the Year award. It is regarded for the half-time shuffle which drummer Jeff Porcaro developed for the song, and for its production: it is generally seen as being one of the best mastered songs of all time. The groove has become an important staple of drum repertoire and is commonly known as the "Rosanna shuffle".

The song reached number two on the Billboard Hot 100 for five consecutive weeks, behind "Don't You Want Me" by the Human League and "Eye of the Tiger" by Survivor. It was also one of the band's most successful singles in the UK, peaking at No. 12 on the UK Singles Chart and remaining on the chart for eight weeks. Steve Porcaro and Lukather described it as "the ultimate Toto track".

== Composition and lyrics ==
The song was written by David Paich, who has said that the song is based on numerous girls he had known. He said that "Rosanna is about three girls I knew, all rolled into one". At the time Paich wrote the song, Toto keyboardist Steve Porcaro was dating Rosanna Arquette. Bobby Kimball, who covered some of the song's lead vocals, said that the band "got on quite well with her. "She was going out with Steve and we were always respectful to each other's partners."

As a joke, the band members initially played along with the common assumption that the song was based solely on Arquette. She commented in an interview that the song was about "my showing up at 4 a.m., bringing them juice and beer at their sessions". Paich used the name "Rosanna" as he was looking for a name that worked after the "Meet you all the way" lyric in the chorus, saying that "after I met Rosanna Arquette I just stole her name and stuck it on there."

In the verses, the key is changed from G major to F major, accompanied on the original recording by the lead vocalist changing from Steve Lukather to Bobby Kimball. Lukather and Kimball worked together to transpose the second half of the verses into a different key.

== Recording ==
The drum pattern is known as a "half-time shuffle", and shows "definite jazz influence", featuring ghost notes and derived from the combination of the Purdie shuffle, Led Zeppelin drummer John Bonham's shuffle on "Fool in the Rain", and the Bo Diddley beat. The Purdie shuffle can be prominently heard on Steely Dan's track "Home at Last" from Aja, which Jeff Porcaro cited as an influence.

The overlapping keyboard solos in the middle were created by David Paich and Steve Porcaro recording a multitude of keyboard lines (some of which were cut from the final recording) using a Micro-Composer, a Minimoog, Yamaha CS-80s, Prophets, a Hammond organ, and a GS1, among other instruments. Paich credits Porcaro with both coming up with the concept for the segment and playing a majority of the parts. The basic rhythm track was completed in one day and the guitar solo was recorded in one take.

The album version starts with the drum beat only then kicks into the rest of the melody, then ends with two renditions of the song's chorus and goes into a musical interlude and fades out from there. According to Lukather, this final instrumental section was a spontaneous jam during the recording session: "... the song was supposed to end but Jeff carried on and Dave started playing the honky-tonk piano and we all just followed on". The single edit goes right into the melody at the beginning, then the song fades out during the first singing of the chorus at the end.

== Critical reception ==
Cash Box said that it "is a varied palette of pleasing pop shades". Billboard said "The arrangement is more complex than anything Toto's known for, mixing rock power chords with softer passages". Classic Rock History critic Brian Kachejian rated it as Toto's greatest song, saying that it was "Easily one of the 1980's best singles".

== Music video ==
The West Side Story-inspired video was directed by Steve Barron and set in a stylized urban streetscape, with Rosanna represented by a dancer whose bright red dress contrasts with the gray surroundings. The band plays within a chain-link fence enclosure. Cynthia Rhodes is featured as the lead dancer Rosanna, which led to her being cast in Staying Alive the following year. Patrick Swayze was also uncredited as a dancer in the music video and he and Rhodes would both star in the movie Dirty Dancing.

Despite not playing on the actual recording, new bassist Mike Porcaro (brother of Jeff and Steve) appears in the video, as original Toto bass player David Hungate left before the video was made. Lenny Castro is also featured with the band as a percussionist.

== Personnel ==
Adapted from album's liner notes.

Toto

- Steve Lukather – lead and backing vocals, guitars
- Bobby Kimball – lead and backing vocals
- David Paich – keyboards, backing vocals
- Steve Porcaro – keyboards
- David Hungate – bass
- Jeff Porcaro – drums

Additional musicians

- Lenny Castro – percussion
- Tom Scott – tenor saxophone
- Jim Horn – baritone saxophone
- Gary Grant – trumpet
- Jerry Hey – trumpet
- Jimmy Pankow – trombone
- Tom Kelly – backing vocals

Production

- David Paich – composition, lyrics, horn arrangements
- Steve Porcaro – synthesizer programming
- Jerry Hey – horn arrangements
- Al Schmitt – recording/tracking
- Greg Ladanyi – mixing
- George Marino – mastering

== Charts ==
=== Weekly charts ===
Chart (1982–1983)	Peak position
Australia (Kent Music Report)	16
Austria (Ö3 Austria Top 40)	11
Belgium (Ultratop 50 Flanders)	20
Canada Top Singles (RPM)	4
Canada Adult Contemporary (RPM)	7
TROS Europarade	20
French Singles Chart	46
Germany (GfK)	24
Ireland (IRMA)	11
Italian Singles Chart	12
Netherlands (Single Top 100)	6
New Zealand (Recorded Music NZ)	22
Norway (VG-lista)	2
South African Singles Chart	3
Spanish Radio Chart	31
Switzerland (Schweizer Hitparade)	3
U.K. Singles Chart	12
US Billboard Hot 100	2
US Adult Contemporary (Billboard)	17
US Mainstream Rock Airplay (Billboard)	8

=== Year-end charts ===
Chart (1982)	Rank
Australia (Kent Music Report)	74
Canada Top Singles (RPM)	27
Dutch Top 40	31
Italian Singles Chart	30
South African Singles Chart	15
US Top Pop Singles (Billboard)	14

== Certifications ==
Region	Certification	Certified units/sales
Australia (ARIA)	Gold	35,000^{‡}
Canada (Music Canada)	Gold	50,000^{^}
Denmark (IFPI Danmark)	Gold	45,000^{‡}
New Zealand (RMNZ)	2× Platinum	60,000^{‡}
United Kingdom (BPI)	Gold	400,000^{‡}
United States (RIAA)	2× Platinum	2,000,000^{‡}
^{^} Shipments figures based on certification alone.^{‡} Sales+streaming figures based on certification alone.

== Weezer cover ==
"Rosanna"

Single by Weezer
- A-side: "Africa"
- Released: May 24, 2018
- Recorded: 2018
- Genre: Alternative rock; power pop; pop rock; yacht rock
- Length: 4:52
- Label: Atlantic
- Producer: Patrick Wilson

Weezer singles chronology
"Happy Hour" (2017)	"Rosanna" (2018)	"Africa" (2018)

In May 2018, the American rock band Weezer released a cover of the track as a viral marketing stunt after fans requested that they cover "Africa", another song by Toto. The social media effort, spearheaded by the teenage-run Twitter account @WeezerAfrica, gained significant traction and widespread media attention.

Weezer's cover of "Rosanna" was released as a non-album digital single and subsequently included as a B-side on 7-inch vinyl release of the band's cover of "Africa" which they released just a few days after "Rosanna", fulfilling the original viral request.

Toto's guitarist Steve Lukather publicly stated he was "flattered" by Weezer's cover. In a reciprocal move, Toto recorded their own cover of the Weezer track "Hash Pipe" and released it in August 2018.
