= Louise Tucker =

British singer

Louise Tucker (born 1956) is an English mezzo-soprano opera singer from Bristol, England. She achieved success in the early 1980s by recording two albums with record producers Charlie Skarbek and Tim Smit. The albums are notable for combining Tucker's classically-trained operatic voice with synthpop music.

== Career ==
Tucker studied at the Guildhall School Of Music And Drama in London. It was here that she trained as an opera singer. Tucker's first album with Skarbek and Smit was Midnight Blue (A Project With Louise Tucker). The title track, "Midnight Blue", was released as a single in the UK, US, France, and several other countries, and it reached number 59 in the UK Singles Chart in April 1983, and number 46 on the US Hot 100 in August 1983. It also reached number 10 on the US Adult Contemporary Chart. The album reached number 127 in the US Billboard 200 chart. The song "Only for You" was also released as a single in some countries.

A follow-up album, After the Storm, was released in 1983. The title track, "Dancing by Moonlight" and "No Tears To Cry", were all released as singles in the UK. After the release of her second album, Tucker focused on a career as an opera singer.

She has performed with several opera companies, including Dublin Grand Opera and Kent Opera. She also works as a teacher for young singers.

== Discography ==
=== Studio albums ===
List of albums, with selected details and chart positions
Title	Album details	Peak chart positions	
Title	Album details	AUS	US
Midnight Blue	Released: 1982; Format: LP; Label: Ariola	72	127
After the Storm	Released: 1983; Label: EMI (EMA-319)	—	—

=== Singles ===
List of singles, with selected chart positions
Title	Year	Peak chart positions			Album
Title	Year	UK	AUS	US	Album
"Midnight Blue"	1982	59	27	46	Midnight Blue
"Dancing by Moonlight"	1983	—	—	—	After the Storm
"Only for You"	1984	—	80	—	After the Storm
