= Africa (song) =

1982 single by Toto

- US 7-inch (180 mm) shaped picture disc edition

Single by Toto

from the album Toto IV
- B-side: "Good for You"; "We Made It"
- Released: June 25, 1982 (UK); October 7, 1982 (US)
- Recorded: June 1981
- Studio: Sunset Sound (Hollywood)
- Genre: Pop; synth-pop; soft rock; yacht rock
- Length: 4:55 (album version); 4:21 (single version); 4:35 (video version)
- Label: Columbia
- Composers: David Paich; Jeff Porcaro
- Lyricist: David Paich
- Producer: Toto

Toto singles chronology
"Make Believe" (1982)	"Africa" (1982)	"I Won't Hold You Back" (1983)

Music video
- "Africa" on YouTube

Audio sample
- file; help

"Africa" is a song by American rock band Toto, the tenth and final track on their fourth studio album, Toto IV (1982). It was the second single from the album released in Europe (in the United Kingdom), in June 1982 on CBS Records, and the third in the United States, in October 1982 through Columbia Records. The song was written by band members David Paich and Jeff Porcaro, produced by the band, and mixed by engineer Greg Ladanyi.

Critics praised its composition and gentle production; the song continues to receive critical acclaim, and was ranked number 452 on Rolling Stone's 500 Greatest Songs of All Time.

The song was accompanied by a music video, which premiered in 1983, and was directed by Steve Barron, who collaborated previously with the group for "Rosanna". The video features Toto in a library, as they perform and showcase various aspects of African culture. In June 2024, the music video reached the one billion view milestone on YouTube. While popular in the 1980s and 1990s, with the song being certified gold by the RIAA in 1991, "Africa" saw a resurgence in popularity via social media during the mid- to late 2010s. The original recording has since been certified Diamond and is one of the best-selling songs of all time.

== Background ==
The initial idea and lyrics for the song came from David Paich. Paich was playing around with a new keyboard, the CS-80, and found the brassy sound that became the opening riff. He completed the melody and lyrics for the chorus in about ten minutes, much to Paich's surprise. "I sang the chorus out as you hear it. It was like God channeling it. I thought, 'I'm talented, but I'm not that talented. Something just happened here!'" Paich refined the lyrics for six months before showing the song to the rest of the band.

In 2015, Paich explained that the song is about a man's love of a continent, Africa, rather than just a personal romance. He based the lyrics on a late night documentary with depictions of African plight and suffering. The viewing experience made a lasting impact on Paich: "It both moved and appalled me, and the pictures just wouldn't leave my head. I tried to imagine how I'd feel about it if I was there and what I'd do." Jeff Porcaro elaborates further, explaining: "A white boy is trying to write a song on Africa, but since he's never been there, he can only tell what he's seen on TV or remembers in the past."

Some additional lyrics relate to a person flying in to meet a lonely missionary, as Paich described in 2018. As a child, Paich attended a Catholic school; several of his teachers had done missionary work in Africa. Their missionary work became the inspiration behind the line: "I bless the rains down in Africa." Paich, who at the time had never set foot in Africa, based the song's landscape descriptions from an article in National Geographic. At the time, Steve Lukather humorously remarked that he would run "naked down Hollywood Boulevard" if the song became a hit, due to his bemusement over the lyrics; Paich argued that it was a "fantasy song" in the vein of songs such as "Margaritaville".

During an appearance on the radio station KROQ-FM, Lukather and Steve Porcaro described the song as "dumb" and "an experiment" and some of the lyrics as "goofy" that were just placeholders, particularly the line about the Serengeti. Engineer Al Schmitt stated that "Africa" was the second song written for Toto IV and had been worked on extensively in the studio. Eventually, the band grew tired of the song and considered cutting it from the album entirely. Paich considered saving "Africa" for a solo record but decided against it.

The band did not expect "Africa" to be a hit, after the intended success of lead single "Rosanna" (which had peaked at number 2). However, after Sony found out that the song was gaining traction in New York dance clubs, they decided to release it as another single, further cementing the popularity of Toto IV in the process.

== Composition ==
Musically, the song took some time to assemble. Steve Porcaro, the band's synth player, introduced Paich to the Yamaha CS-80, a polyphonic analog synthesizer, and instructed him to write a song specifically with the keyboard in mind. Paich gravitated towards a brassy flute sound, which he found to be a unique alternative to the piano. Porcaro programmed the famous kalimba riff on a Yamaha GS-1 digital piano. The kalimba riff was recorded six times, each with different rhythms, and layered. Steve Lukather used a variety of guitars on the song, including a Takamine 6-string electric-acoustic guitar, a Takamine 12-string electric-acoustic guitar that doubled the keyboard lines, a direct-input Fender Stratocaster, and a Gibson Les Paul for the distorted guitar parts. Steve Porcaro's brother, Jeff, played his parts live without a click track.

So when we were doing "Africa" I set up a bass drum, snare drum and a hi-hat, and Lenny Castro set up right in front of me with a conga. We looked at each other and just started playing the basic groove. [...] The backbeat is on 3, so it's a half-time feel, and it's 16th notes on the hi-hat. [...] We played for five minutes on tape, no click, no nothing. We just played. And I was singing the bass line for 'Africa' in my mind, so we had a relative tempo. Lenny and I went into the booth and listened back to the five minutes of that same boring pattern. We picked out the best two bars that we thought were grooving, and we marked those two bars on tape. [...] Maybe it would have taken two minutes to program that in the Linn, and it took about half an hour to do this. But a Linn machine doesn't feel like that!

Jeff Porcaro also acknowledged that he was influenced by the sounds created by fellow Los Angeles session musicians Milt Holland and Emil Richards. He also described the significance of the African pavilion drummers at the 1964 New York World's Fair and a National Geographic Special. To recreate those sounds, he and his father Joe made percussion loops on bottle caps and marimba respectively.

I was about 11 when the New York World's Fair took place, and I went to the African pavilion with my family. I saw the real thing ... It was the first time I witnessed somebody playing one beat and not straying from it, like a religious experience, where it gets loud, and everyone goes into a trance.

Lyrically, the song concerns a man torn between staying in Africa, a continent he is enamored of, and travelling to stay with a girl he is seeing. In the chorus, he "bless[es] the rains down in Africa"; several other references to other parts of the continent are made throughout, such as "wild dogs [crying] out in the night" and "Kilimanjaro [rising]... above the Serengeti" (which are, in reality, about 420 kilometres (260 mi) apart). Stereogum writer Tom Breihan interpreted the song's Africa as an "extended metaphor" – a "stand-in [for] a thing that you long for even before you've said goodbye to it", and therefore potentially a partial allusion to Paich's own "rock stardom... that kept him apart from anything resembling a normal life". Rob Sheffield of Rolling Stone interpreted it differently, as a song about "modern alienation", with the speaker "lost in time and space": he "doesn't know a thing about Africa, except it has to be better than the nightmare where he's trapped right now".

== Music video ==
The music video used the radio edit and was directed by Steve Barron (who had also directed the music video for "Rosanna") It features Mike Porcaro on bass, replacing David Hungate, who had already left the band before the video was made. Lenny Castro is also featured in the video, on percussion. On June 4, 2024, the music video broke the one billion view milestone on YouTube.

In the video, a researcher in a library (portrayed by Paich) tries to match a scrap of a picture of a shield to the book from which it was torn out. As he continues his search, a female librarian (portrayed by Jenny Douglas-McRae) working at a nearby desk takes occasional notice of him, while an African man in a generic tribal outfit carrying a shield that matches the picture begins to close in on the library from the surrounding jungle. When the researcher finds a book titled Africa, the man throws a spear at a bookshelf, toppling stacks of books. Africa falls open to the page from which the scrap was torn, but a lantern lands on it and sets it on fire, after which the librarian's eyeglasses are shown falling to the floor. The scenes are intercut with shots of a globe and the band performing atop a stack of giant hardcover books, in which Africa is the topmost.

The video has been criticized for its portrayal of African culture, with Sheffield calling it "mind-blowingly racist". Breihan described it as "almost shockingly racist", but nonetheless found that it "succeeds at its goal of making Toto seem visually compelling and translating the over-the-top drama of 'Africa' into something cinematic". Commenting on the backlash, Barron said that "there should have been [backlash]. But I don't think there was...that is probably kind of a white guy's, outsider view of the meaning of the song."

== Reception and legacy ==
The song was popular upon its release, hitting number one on the Billboard Hot 100 in February 1983, and also reaching the top 10 in many other worldwide record charts.

The song has continued to be a popular rock classic up to the 21st century. Cash Box called it an "image-filled package of pop exotica with its gently tropical synth and marimba". Billboard called it an "evocative number" that should return the group to the top 10 on the Billboard Hot 100 after the weaker single "Make Believe". Mark Cooper of Record Mirror labeled it as a "state-of-the-art song for FM radio fans." Classic Rock History critic Brian Kachejian rated it as Toto's 5th greatest song. In 2021, it was listed at No. 452 on Rolling Stone's "500 Greatest Songs of All Time", being acclaimed as a "yacht-rock touchstone" and receiving praise for its "instantly calming synthesiser riff" and "soaring chorus".

Breihan positively reviewed the song as part of a column reviewing each Billboard Hot 100 #1. Ultimately giving it an 8/10 rating, he noted the song's "perfectly ridiculous act of hubris" in its "hackneyed, overwrought" lyrics comparing the 'Africa' depicted to Paich's supposed yearning for a "normal life", but acclaimed its complete lack of "self-consciousness" and confidence in its premise, lauding its "ultra-ridiculous synth-gloop" and "operatic" chorus. Critic Carl Wilson commented on the song's "perfect marriage of terrible and good", with its acute musicality – he described it as "well-played, well-sung, harmonically enticing, rhythmically enticing" – juxtaposed with a "completely incoherent text about Africa".

The song's inaccurate lyrical depiction of Africa, especially as seen from an otherwise-detached American perspective, has been commented on by various critics. Stereogum writer Vivek Maddala argued that "it's not hard to view [the song] as an expression of a glib neo-colonial mentality" and a "Rudyard Kipling 'White Man's Burden'-type narrative", especially with the lyrics being written in an "awkward, reductive way", but nevertheless noted that Paich wrote it "from a benign (if naïve) standpoint". Michael Hann of the Financial Times claimed that the lyrics are "filled with false nostalgia and riddled with errors", referencing the unrealistic line "as sure as Kilimanjaro rises like Olympus above the Serengeti", and even referred to the marimba and "cod-African solos" which might also be perceived as cultural appropriation. He nonetheless acknowledged that the lyrics still come off as "romantic and yearning", and the latter musical aspects form "part of its period charm". Sheffield argued that the inaccuracy displayed in the lyrics actually does not matter, as they nonetheless effectively portray the speaker's feelings of alienation and placelessness, being "homesick for nowhere" and "deep in his feelings".

=== Cultural impact ===
Hann hypothesised that the song's musically "indelible" nature and status as a "song that exists to be sung" has given it a cultural staying power over the decades. Sheffield additionally compared it to another '80s rock hit with strong cultural endurance, Journey's "Don't Stop Believin'", and highlighted its position as a cultural touchstone and an "unofficial anthem". The song has been utilized in many internet memes, has appeared in television shows, such as Late Night with Jimmy Fallon, Stranger Things, Family Guy, Chuck, The Cleveland Show, Top Gear and South Park, and was used by CBS during their 2013 coverage of the funeral of former South African President Nelson Mandela, albeit not without controversy. It was also included in the 2002 video game Grand Theft Auto: Vice City as part of the fictional Emotion 98.3 radio station.

In 2012, "Africa" was listed by music magazine NME in 32nd place on its list of "50 Most Explosive Choruses." "Africa" saw a resurgence in popularity via social media during the mid- to late 2010s, inspiring numerous Internet memes as well as a fan-requested cover by American rock band Weezer which peaked at number 51 on the Billboard Hot 100. In January 2019, a sound installation was set up in an undisclosed location in the Namib desert to play the song on a constant loop. The installation is powered by solar batteries, allowing the song to be played indefinitely. Two years later, the song reached 1 billion plays on the streaming site Spotify. In 2022, the song was revealed as the third most streamed song of the 1970s, 1980s and 1990s in the UK (behind Oasis's "Wonderwall" and Queen's "Bohemian Rhapsody"). In 2024, "Africa" surpassed one billion plays on YouTube, becoming Toto's first song to reach this milestone.

=== Band response ===
Members of the band have since expressed their amazement at the song's cultural footprint. Though he admits that he "sometimes hates" it, having played it "since 1982", Lukather has notably been surprised over the evergreen popularity of "Africa", which he claims has "outlived [Toto's] haters and been very good to [him]". He has also positively noted Toto's upturn in popularity with young people, especially as more attend their concerts. The band nowadays deliver an extended rendition of the song every concert, engaging in a call-and-response section with the audience. Paich notes that the band "has a good sense of humour about [themselves]" regarding the many references to the song in media; Lukather remarks his amusement at a portrayal of himself playing "Africa" on South Park. According to Paich, the band has also received complaints concerning the ridiculousness of the song, but prefers to "laugh it off"; he especially maintains his view that one can see Kilimanjaro from the Serengeti. Contrary to the criticism, he remarks that people from Johannesburg and Cape Town have asked him how he was able to "describe" the place "so beautifully", despite not having visited Africa at the time.

== Personnel ==
Adapted from Toto IV album liner notes.

Toto

- David Paich – lead and backing vocals, synthesizer, piano
- Bobby Kimball – lead and backing vocals
- Steve Lukather – guitars, backing vocals
- Steve Porcaro – synthesizers
- David Hungate – bass
- Jeff Porcaro – drums, cowbell, gong, additional percussion

Additional personnel

- Lenny Castro – congas, shakers, additional percussion
- Joe Porcaro – bass marimba, additional percussion
- Jim Horn – recorders
- Timothy B. Schmit – backing vocals

Production

- David Paich – composition, lyrics
- Jeff Porcaro – composition
- Steve Porcaro – synth programming
- Al Schmitt – recording/tracking
- Greg Ladanyi – mixing
- George Marino – mastering

== Charts ==
=== Weekly charts ===
Chart (1982–1983)	Peak position
Australia (Kent Music Report)	5
Austria (Ö3 Austria Top 40)	7
Belgium (Ultratop 50 Flanders)	7
Canada Top Singles (RPM)	1
Canada Adult Contemporary (RPM)	8
Germany (GfK)	14
Ireland (IRMA)	2
Netherlands (Single Top 100)	4
New Zealand (Recorded Music NZ)	5
Switzerland (Schweizer Hitparade)	6
UK Singles (Official Charts)	3
US Billboard Hot 100	1
US Cashbox	3
US Adult Contemporary (Billboard)	5

Chart (2013)	Peak position
New Zealand RMNZ Singles Chart	5
Slovenia Airplay (SloTop50)	16

Chart (2022–2026)	Peak position
Global 200 (Billboard)	95
Netherlands Airplay (Dutch Charts)	45
Norway (IFPI Norge)	48
Poland (Polish Airplay Top 100)	59
Portugal (AFP)	155
Sweden (Sverigetopplistan)	40

=== Year-end charts ===
Chart (1982)	Rank
Belgian VRT Top 30	85
Dutch Top 40	18
German Media Control Chart	88

Chart (1983)	Rank
Australia (Kent Music Report)	25
Canada Top Singles (RPM)	16
Italian Singles Chart	75
UK Singles Chart	38
US Billboard Hot 100	24
US Cash Box Top 100	29

Chart (2023)	Rank
Netherlands (Single Top 100)	93

Chart (2024)	Rank
Netherlands (Single Top 100)	80

Chart (2025)	Rank
Estonia Airplay (TopHit)	178
Global 200 (Billboard)	196
Netherlands (Single Top 100)	58
Switzerland (Schweizer Hitparade)	79

== Certifications ==
Region	Certification	Certified units/sales
Australia (ARIA)	14× Platinum	980,000^{‡}
Canada (Music Canada)	Gold	50,000^{^}
Denmark (IFPI Danmark)	3× Platinum	270,000^{‡}
Germany (BVMI)	2× Platinum	1,200,000^{‡}
Italy (FIMI)	2× Platinum	140,000^{‡}
New Zealand (RMNZ)	11× Platinum	330,000^{‡}
Portugal (AFP)	3× Platinum	75,000^{‡}
Spain (Promusicae)	2× Platinum	120,000^{‡}
United Kingdom (BPI)	6× Platinum	3,600,000^{‡}
United States (RIAA)	Diamond	10,000,000^{‡}
^{^} Shipments figures based on certification alone.^{‡} Sales+streaming figures based on certification alone.

== Weezer version ==
"Africa"

Single by Weezer

from the album Weezer (Teal Album)
- B-side: "Rosanna"
- Released: May 29, 2018
- Recorded: 2018
- Genre: Alternative rock; power pop; pop rock; yacht rock
- Length: 3:58
- Label: Atlantic; Crush
- Songwriters: David Paich; Jeff Porcaro
- Producer: Patrick Wilson

Weezer singles chronology
"Rosanna" (2018)	"Africa" (2018)	"California Snow" (2018)

Music video
- "Africa" on YouTube

In December 2017, Twitter user "@WeezerAfrica", run by 14-year-old Cleveland, Ohio resident Mary Klym, tweeted, "@RiversCuomo it's about time you bless the rains down in Africa." The band released a cover of "Rosanna", a different Toto song (also from the album Toto IV), in order to troll Klym and those clamoring for a version of "Africa". Weezer released "Africa" on May 29, 2018. It was the band's first Hot 100 hit since 2009. The song reached number 51 on the Hot 100 and peaked at number one on the Billboard Alternative Songs chart in August 2018, becoming the band's first number-one [alternative] single since 2008.

A limited edition 7-inch vinyl pressing was released by Weezer in July 2018 and sold exclusively through Urban Outfitters. The pressing was limited to 1,500 copies, with "Africa" as the A-side and "Rosanna" as the B-side. Weezer included the cover on their surprise release of the all-covers Teal Album in January 2019.

Shortly after the song's release, Weezer appeared on Jimmy Kimmel Live! along with keyboardist Steve Porcaro of Toto to promote the single. Toto responded on August 9, 2018, by releasing a cover of Weezer's 2001 single "Hash Pipe", after debuting it in concert a week prior.

Weezer released a music video of their "Africa" cover in September 2018, styled as a parody of the video for their earlier single "Undone – The Sweater Song". Stand-ins for the band members perform the song on a soundstage, with "Weird Al" Yankovic replacing singer/guitarist Rivers Cuomo, with his band members replacing Weezer. Yankovic had previously appeared onstage during the band's tour to perform "Africa" with them.

Despite its warm reception, Lukather said in January 2025 that he was not a fan of the cover, claiming that Cuomo did it for the money with no real affection for the song, a sentiment which Steve Porcaro expressed in a separate interview. He added that Cuomo hurt his feelings even more when he tried reaching out to him and Cuomo failed to respond.

=== Charts ===
Weekly charts

Chart (2018)	Peak position
Canada Rock (Billboard)	33
Mexico Ingles Airplay (Billboard)	42
US Billboard Hot 100	51
US Adult Contemporary (Billboard)	19
US Adult Pop Airplay (Billboard)	3
US Hot Rock & Alternative Songs (Billboard)	5
US Pop Airplay (Billboard)	26
US Rock & Alternative Airplay (Billboard)	1

Year-end charts

Chart (2018)	Position
US Adult Contemporary (Billboard)	47
US Adult Top 40 (Billboard)	23
US Hot Rock Songs (Billboard)	10
US Rock Airplay (Billboard)	6

== See also ==
- List of best-selling singles
- List of best-selling singles in Australia
- List of highest-certified digital singles in the United States
- List of RPM number-one singles of 1983
- List of Billboard Hot 100 number-one singles of 1983
- "Africa" (Karl Wolf song)
