= Midnight Blue (Louise Tucker song) =

Single by Louise Tucker

from the album Midnight Blue
- Released: 29 September 1982
- Recorded: 1982
- Genre: Synthpop, classical crossover
- Label: Arista (US) / Ariola Records (Europe)
- Songwriters: Ludwig van Beethoven, Charles Skarbek, Timothy Bartel Smit
- Producer: Charlie Skarbek

"Midnight Blue" is the title of a 1982-3 international hit by Louise Tucker which served as the title cut for Tucker's debut album Midnight Blue. The single also features Charlie Skarbek on vocals.

In the spring of 1982, opera singer Louise Tucker met record producer Tim Smit when she accompanied his sister-in-law who'd come to babysit for him: this meeting led to Tucker recording the demo for the track "Midnight Blue" - which utilized the melody of the second movement of "Sonata Pathétique" by Beethoven - with Smit and his friend Charlie Skarbek producing. Smit and Skarbek successfully shopped the track to the Dutch division of Ariola Records and the finished track was cut at Chestnut Studios in Farnham. The Dutch Ariola cassette release (405.007) notes Chestnut recording studios as being in Frensham (south of Farnham), with Abbey Road Studios, London also involved. Recording period given as June to September 1982.

"Midnight Blue" reached #13 in the Netherlands in November 1982. In December, the track entered the French charts where it remained for 31 weeks, reaching #1 in the Christmas of 1983. At the same time, Michèle Torr hit the French charts with a rendering in French by lyricist Pierre Delanoë entitled "Midnight Blue en Irlande" (#13).

Picked up by Arista Records for North American release, "Midnight Blue" first broke in Canada reaching #7 in April (going platinum) and entering the US charts in June to reach #46 on the Billboard Hot 100 and #10 on the Adult Contemporary chart.

The track entered the UK charts about a year after its recording in April 1983: it failed to become a major hit peaking at #59. See Notes^{1} ^{2}

In July 1983 "Midnight Blue" reached #6 in Sweden: that year the track also charted in Australia (#27), Denmark (#1) and Germany (#51).

== Notes ==
- ^{1}An instrumental version of "Midnight Blue" by Dutch trumpeter Pete Knarren charted in the UK in the same time period as Louise Tucker's version: Knarren's version - released on EMI - peaked at #80.
- ^{2}The version by the group Dreamers was also a hit in early 80s.
