= Waiting for Your Love =

Single by Toto

from the album Toto IV
- B-side: "Lovers in the Night"
- Released: June 1983 (US); July 29, 1983 (UK)
- Length: 4:12
- Label: Columbia
- Songwriters: Bobby Kimball; David Paich
- Producer: Toto

Toto singles chronology
"I Won't Hold You Back" (1983)	"Waiting for Your Love" (1983)	"Stranger in Town" (1984)

"Waiting for Your Love" is a song by the American rock band Toto from their 1982 album Toto IV. In 1983, it was released as the final single, peaking at number 73 on the Billboard Hot 100 chart. It was also the final single released featuring the band's original lineup.

== Composition ==
The song was written by vocalist Bobby Kimball and keyboardist David Paich and is performed in the key of A-flat major.

Kimball said in an interview that he "wrote it in the '70s and originally called it 'You Got Me'". This has been substantiated by his producer John Zaika. It was originally written in 1977, and Kimball only had the verses completed in that original demo. He and David Paich later wrote the chorus in 1981 when recording Toto IV.

== Reception ==
Retrospectively, Preston Frazier of Somethingelsereviews.com wrote that Bobby Kimball gave a "fantastic lead vocal" performance in the song, and that "Waiting for Your Love" has "an infectious ... danceable, back beat".

== Personnel ==
Taken from the Toto IV liner notes.

- Bobby Kimball – lead and backing vocals
- Steve Lukather – guitar, backing vocals
- David Paich – keyboards, backing vocals
- Steve Porcaro – keyboards
- David Hungate – bass
- Jeff Porcaro – drums, percussion
