= Toto (album) =

Studio album by Toto
- Released: October 10, 1978
- Recorded: October 1977 – June 1978
- Studios: Studio 55 (Hollywood); Additional recording locations: Davlen Sound Studios (North Hollywood); Sunset Sound (Hollywood)
- Genres: Soft rock; pop rock; jazz rock; arena rock; funk rock; hard rock; R&B
- Length: 40:46
- Label: Columbia
- Producer: Toto

Toto chronology
| Toto (1978) | Hydra (1979) |

Singles from Toto
- 1. "Hold the Line" Released: September 1978; 2. "I'll Supply the Love" Released: January 1979; 3. "Georgy Porgy" Released: April 1979; 4. "Rockmaker" Released: May 1979 (Netherlands)

Toto is the debut studio album by American rock band Toto, released on October 10, 1978 by Columbia Records. It includes the hit singles "Hold the Line", "I'll Supply the Love" and "Georgy Porgy", all three of which made it into the top 50 in the US. "Hold the Line" spent six weeks in the top 10, and reached number 14 in the UK as well.

Although not initially very well received by critics, the band quickly gained a following, and the album gained a reputation for its characteristic sound, mixing soft pop with both synth and hard-rock elements. The band would venture deeper into hard rock territory on their next album.

== Background and composition ==
In the years leading up to the band's formation, the future members of Toto worked as session musicians in Los Angeles, California, for artists such as Seals & Crofts, Steely Dan, Boz Scaggs, Barbra Streisand, Leo Sayer, The Pointer Sisters, Alice Cooper, among others. In 1975, high school friends David Paich and Jeff Porcaro worked with Boz Scaggs on his album Silk Degrees. They were joined by bassist David Hungate, who they knew from being in the Sonny & Cher band and countless other sessions. The trio were then joined by keyboardist Steve Porcaro (Jeff's younger brother), percussionist Lenny Castro, and eventually guitarist Steve Lukather in Scaggs's touring band. Bassist Mike Porcaro (Jeff's younger brother), who would later joined Toto in 1982, also toured in Scaggs' band. In 1977, the group recruited vocalist Bobby Kimball (formerly of S.S. Fools) and officially formed Toto under the direction of Paich and Jeff Porcaro. Through their connections as well known session musicians, the band secured a recording contract with Columbia Records, and began work on their debut album.

The band spent nine months in the recording studio. Aside from "You Are the Flower", written by Kimball about the birth of his daughter in 1976, and "Takin' It Back", written by Steve Porcaro, all the songs on the album were written by Paich. He composed the album's opening instrumental track, "Child's Anthem", while studying classical music at the University of Southern California.

The album's ten tracks span a variety of genres that would later define Toto's style, including rock, pop, jazz, progressive rock, R&B, and soul. The album also showcased vocal performances from four of the six members of Toto.

== Release ==
Toto was released in October 1978 and was promoted with four singles, three of which were commercial hits. "Hold the Line" spent six weeks on the US Billboard Hot 100 chart, peaking at number 5. "I’ll Supply the Love" and "Georgy Porgy" both charted within the top 50 of the Hot 100. In 2019, the album was reissued as part of the All In CD box set, and was remastered by the band and Elliot Scheiner.

=== Cover art ===
Drummer Jeff Porcaro explained that Philip Garris, known for painting many Grateful Dead album covers, created the album's emblem inspired by lyrics from the fourth track, "Manuela Run", which referenced the Sword of Damocles: "Don't look now, you better watch that sword that's hanging over you". The sword symbolized the band's powerful, hard-edged sound, with its double-edged design reflecting their versatility across music genres. The iron ring represented the construction of the record itself, while the ribbons tied into the Year of the Child theme.

== Critical reception ==
Professional ratings
Review scores
| Source | Rating |
|---|---|
| AllMusic | 4/5 stars |
| Melodic | 5/5 stars |

Upon its release, Toto received generally positive reviews. Billboard wrote on October 7, 1978 that Toto offers a "rock twist" with its instrumental opening track, Child's Anthem", and that the harmonies and instrumentals stood out. On the same day, Cashbox described the album as a "a collection of accessible, sophisticated pop-rock confections," adding that while the band boasted "clean, crisp instrumental work," it also possessed "several capable lead vocalists." Earlier, on September 30, Billboard had also considered that "Hold the Line" boasted a "scorching mix and a solid hook", highlighted by Kimball's "exciting" vocals and the "scorching" instrumentals. Meanwhile, Cashbox wrote that the single offered "simple emphatic piano part [sic], heavy surging guitars, pleasant turns, fine singing and strong chorus."

By December 1978, reviews from various newspapers echoed similar sentiments. On December 1, John Laycock of The Windsor Star, wrote that Toto sounded like a real working band that understood "what's out there beyond the transistors," stating that the album was not one for "virtuosos" but rather one for hits. On the same day, Timothy Yagle of The Michigan Daily noted that the album's music was reminiscent of the bands Toto's members had worked with as session musicians. He described the album as easy to listen to "good conversation music" and described it as a "pleasant combination of soft rock", with a "good beat" and "danceable" songs. He predicted that with "great tunes" like "Hold the Line", which Yagle thought sounded like Walter Egan's "Magnet and Steel", "Toto should see a promising future." On December 3, Pete Bishop of The Pittsburgh Press said that while "Child's Anthem", the part "material, part Baroque and part rock" opening track, set the stage for the "quality of musicianship to follow", the music was somewhat wasted as the lyrics did not "measure up". On December 16, Michael Lawson wrote in The Star-Phoenix that Toto is "slick, melodic and highly listenable," noting that although the majority of the songs were written by David Paich, the album avoided the tendency to "follow any one format."

In contrast, by January 1979, Rolling Stone's Don Shewey delivered a more critical review, calling Toto a "dull debut" expected from a group of session musicians. He argued that the band lacked the two essential elements for "good rock": a singer and a writer. Shewey critiqued Paich's songs as "excuses for back-to-back instrumental solos," and considered that only three members sang "passably", while the fourth, lead vocalist Bobby Kimball, was "terrible." He concluded by describing Toto as a band of "pros, but no poetry."

Retrospective reviews have been positive. AllMusic's William Ruhlmann observed that the band's "rock-studio chops" allowed them to play a variety of pop styles, which implied that "music-making took craft rather than inspiration and that the musical barriers critics like to erect were arbitrary." He suggested that this might explain why radio listeners appreciated the band more than critics. Johan Wippsson of Melodic deemed Toto one of the most important and unique albums in the AOR genre, highlighting its playful and unpolished nature compared to Toto IV. For the album's 45th anniversary, Al Merchor from American Songwriter wrote that Toto's debut is a paradox between "solid consistency" and a "collection of tracks written and performed in various styles." He argued that the album demonstrates how Toto was not just a "mere hodgepodge of in-demand studio musicians," but rather a "real band with a real sound and identity" that arrived fully-formed." Merchor concluded by emphasizing how each member's contribution, blending rock with jazz, R&B, and classical influences, was key to creating something "unique and unmistakably Toto."

== Track listing ==
All tracks are written by David Paich, except where noted.

Side one
| No. | Title | Writer(s) | Lead vocals | Length |
|---|---|---|---|---|
| 1. | "Child's Anthem" (instrumental) | | | 2:45 |
| 2. | "I'll Supply the Love" | | Bobby Kimball | 3:45 |
| 3. | "Georgy Porgy" | | Steve Lukather (verse), Cheryl Lynn (chorus) | 4:08 |
| 4. | "Manuela Run" | | Paich | 3:55 |
| 5. | "You Are the Flower" | Kimball | Kimball | 4:17 |

Side two
| No. | Title | Writer(s) | Lead vocals | Length |
|---|---|---|---|---|
| 6. | "Girl Goodbye" | | Kimball | 6:13 |
| 7. | "Takin' It Back" | Steve Porcaro | S. Porcaro | 3:46 |
| 8. | "Rockmaker" | | Paich | 3:19 |
| 9. | "Hold the Line" | | Kimball | 3:56 |
| 10. | "Angela" | | Lukather (verse), Paich (chorus) | 4:44 |
| Total length: | | | | 40:46 |

== Personnel ==
Adapted from the album's liner notes.

=== Toto ===
- Bobby Kimball – lead vocals (2, 5, 6, 9), backing vocals
- Steve Lukather – guitars, lead vocals (3, 10), backing vocals
- David Paich – piano, organ, keyboards, lead vocals (4, 8, 10), backing vocals
- Steve Porcaro – keyboards, synthesizers, lead vocals (7)
- David Hungate – bass
- Jeff Porcaro – drums

==== Additional musicians ====
- Lenny Castro – percussion
- Jim Horn – saxophone, flute
- Chuck Findley – trumpet
- Raj Neesh – synthesizer
- Cheryl Lynn – co-lead vocals (3)
- Marty Paich – string arrangements
- Joe Porcaro – timpani (1)
- Sid Sharp – string arrangements, strings

=== Production ===
- Produced by Toto
- Engineered and mixed by Tom Knox
- Recorded by Dana Latham and Gabe Veltri
- Mastered by Mike Reese and Ron Hitchcock at The Mastering Lab, Los Angeles, CA
- Cover art – Philip Garris
- Photography and design – Ed Caraeff Studio

== Charts ==
=== Weekly charts ===
| Chart (1978–1979) | Peak position |
|---|---|
| Australian Albums (Kent Music Report) | 2 |
| Canada Top Albums/CDs (RPM) | 9 |
| Dutch Albums (Album Top 100) | 25 |
| German Albums (Offizielle Top 100) | 8 |
| Japanese Albums (Oricon) | 39 |
| New Zealand Albums (RMNZ) | 24 |
| Norwegian Albums (VG-lista) | 12 |
| Swedish Albums (Sverigetopplistan) | 5 |
| UK Albums (Official Charts) | 37 |
| US Billboard 200 | 9 |

=== Year-end charts ===
| Chart (1979) | Peak position |
|---|---|
| Australian Albums (Kent Music Report) | 13 |
| Canada Top Albums/CDs (RPM) | 41 |
| U.S. Billboard Year-End | 19 |

== Certifications ==
| Region | Certification | Certified units/sales |
|---|---|---|
| Australia (ARIA) | Platinum | 70,000^{‡} |
| Canada (Music Canada) | 2× Platinum | 200,000^{^} |
| Denmark (IFPI Danmark) | Gold | 10,000^{‡} |
| Germany (BVMI) | Gold | 250,000^{^} |
| United States (RIAA) | 2× Platinum | 2,000,000^{^} |
^{^} Shipments figures based on certification alone.^{‡} Sales+streaming figures based on certification alone.
