= I Won't Hold You Back =

1982 single by Toto

Single by Toto

from the album Toto IV
- B-side: "Afraid of Love"; "Waiting for Your Love" (NL and JPN)
- Released: October 1982
- Recorded: 1981–1982
- Studio: Sunset Sound (Hollywood)
- Genre: Soft rock; pop
- Length: 4:53
- Label: Columbia
- Songwriter: Steve Lukather
- Producer: Toto

Toto singles chronology
"Africa" (1982)	"I Won't Hold You Back" (1982)	"Waiting for Your Love" (1983)

"I Won't Hold You Back" is a song by American rock band Toto, written and sung by Steve Lukather for their fourth album, Toto IV (1982), and first released as a single in The Netherlands in October 1982, backed with "Waiting for Your Love". It was released in March 1983 in the United States with "Afraid of Love" as the B-side. The song features the Eagles' bassist Timothy B. Schmit on backing vocals during the choruses.

== Composition ==
The track was originally written on piano by guitarist Steve Lukather, though Paich played the piano on the record. He has since recalled that when it was decided the song needed a guitar solo, he improvised it in one take when recording with the Martyn Ford Orchestra.

== Reception ==
Cash Box described it as "a soft torch tune about a man letting go of his lover", praising the "somber vocals, light piano and electric guitar flourishes." Billboard described it as a "grandly-orchestrated ballad".

== Chart performance ==
The power ballad peaked at number 10 in the U.S. on the Billboard Hot 100 chart on May 7, 1983, becoming their fourth and last top ten hit on that chart. It also spent three weeks at number one on the U.S. Adult Contemporary chart. The single only managed to scrape into the top 40 on the UK Singles Chart at No. 37. In Canada, it peaked at number 17 on the RPM Top Singles chart, as well as reaching No. 1 on the Adult Contemporary chart. It also peaked at number 11 in Ireland.

== Personnel ==
Taken from the Toto IV liner notes.

Toto

- Steve Lukather – lead and backing vocals, guitars
- Bobby Kimball - backing vocals
- David Paich – piano, orchestral arrangements
- Steve Porcaro – synthesizers, programming
- David Hungate – bass
- Jeff Porcaro – drums

Additional musicians

- Timothy B. Schmit – backing vocals
- The Martyn Ford Orchestra – orchestra
- James Newton Howard – orchestral arrangements, conducting
- Marty Paich – orchestral arrangements

Production

- Al Schmitt – recording/tracking
- John Kurlander – string recording
- Greg Landanyi – mixing
- George Marino – mastering

== Charts ==
=== Weekly charts ===
Chart (1983)	Peak position
Australia (Kent Music Report)	80
Canada Adult Contemporary (RPM)	1
Canada Top Singles (RPM)	17
Ireland (IRMA)	11
UK Singles (Official Charts)	37
US Cash Box Top 100	14
US Billboard Hot 100	10
US Adult Contemporary (Billboard)	1

=== Year-end charts ===
Year-end chart (1983)	Rank
US Top Pop Singles (Billboard)	69
Cashbox (magazine)	95

== Sampling ==
The song was sampled by house DJ Roger Sanchez in 2001 for his song "Another Chance", reaching number one in the UK Singles Chart.

== Release history ==
Release dates and formats for "I Won't Hold You Back"
Region	Date	Format(s)	Label(s)	Ref.
Netherlands	October 1982	7-inch vinyl	Columbia	
United States	March 1983	7-inch vinyl	Columbia	
United Kingdom	June 1983	7-inch vinyl; 12-inch vinyl	CBS	

== See also ==
- List of Billboard Adult Contemporary number ones of 1983
