= Georgy Porgy (song) =

1979 single by Toto

Single by Toto

from the album Toto
- B-side: "Child's Anthem"
- Released: April 3, 1979
- Genre: Philadelphia soul; rock; funk
- Length: 4:09
- Label: Columbia
- Songwriter: David Paich
- Producer: Toto

Toto singles chronology
"I'll Supply the Love" (1978)	"Georgy Porgy" (1979)	"Rockmaker" (1979)

"Georgy Porgy" (/ˈpɔːrdʒi/) is a song by American rock band Toto. It was written by band member David Paich and included on their self-titled debut album in 1978. Released as the album's third single in 1979, the song reached number 11 on the New Zealand Singles Chart and number 48 on the US Billboard Hot 100. It also peaked at number 18 on Billboard's Hot R&B/Hip-Hop Songs chart.

== Background ==
The lead vocals are performed by guitarist Steve Lukather. Cheryl Lynn provided the female backing vocal, singing an adaptation from the nursery rhyme "Georgie Porgie." In a 1988 interview with Modern Drummer, Jeff Porcaro discussed developing the groove for "Georgy Porgy," saying: "It's imitating Paul Humphrey heavily; it's imitating Earl Palmer very heavily. When it comes to that groove, my biggest influences were Paul Humphrey, Ed Greene, Earl Palmer, and the godfather of that 16th-note groove, James Gadson. That "Georgy Porgy" groove I owe to them."

== Critical reception ==
Cash Box said the song begins "with stout drumming and melodic piano playing, conga backing and excellent overlapping flute, guitar and vocal lines." Billboard called it "an easy flowing, catchy pop disk which contains some jazz and soul elements" and praised the piano and bass playing as well as the vocal line. Record World said that it "has a light jazzy feeling and clear punchy vocals" as well as powerful instrumentation. Classic Rock History critic Brian Kachejian rated it as Toto's 7th greatest song, saying that "The song’s incredible swing feel that was so captivating the first time we heard it, still remains an additive pleasure to listen to almost forty years later."

== Personnel ==
=== Toto ===
- Steve Lukather – lead vocals, guitars
- David Paich – piano
- Steve Porcaro – synthesizers
- David Hungate – bass
- Jeff Porcaro – drums

=== Additional musicians ===
- Lenny Castro – congas, tambourine, claves
- Jim Horn – saxophone, flute
- Chuck Findley – trumpet
- Cheryl Lynn – backing vocals

=== Production ===
- Marty Paich – string arrangements
- Sid Sharp – string arrangements
- Dana Latham – recording/tracking
- Gabe Veltri – recording/tracking
- Tom Knox – mixing
- Mike Reese – mastering
- Ron Hitchcock – mastering

== Release history ==
Region	Date	Ref.
United States	April 3, 1979	
United Kingdom	June 1, 1979	

== Charts ==
Weekly chart performance for "Georgy Porgy"
Chart (1979)	Peak position
New Zealand (Recorded Music NZ)	11
US Billboard Hot 100	48
US Hot R&B/Hip-Hop Songs (Billboard)	18

== Certifications ==
Certifications for "Georgy Porgy"
Region	Certification	Certified units/sales
New Zealand (RMNZ)	Gold	15,000^{‡}
^{‡} Sales+streaming figures based on certification alone.

== Eric Benét version ==
"Georgy Porgy"

Single by Eric Benét featuring Faith Evans

from the album A Day in the Life
- Released: February 8, 1999
- Genre: R&B
- Length: 4:40
- Label: Warner Bros.
- Songwriter: David F. Paich
- Producer: Somethin' for the People

Eric Benét singles chronology
"True to Myself" (1997)	"Georgy Porgy" (1999)	"Spend My Life with You" (1999)

Faith Evans singles chronology
"Heartbreak Hotel" (1998)	"Georgy Porgy" (1999)	"All Night Long" (1999)

Audio
- "Georgy Porgy" on YouTube

American R&B singer-songwriter Eric Benét recorded a cover of "Georgy Porgy" for his second studio album, A Day in the Life (1999). This version features vocals from fellow American R&B singer Faith Evans and was produced by R&B group Somethin' for the People. Released on February 8, 1999, Benét's version was successful in New Zealand, where it peaked at number two on the RIANZ Singles Chart, and it became a top-40 hit in France, the Netherlands, Sweden, and the United Kingdom.

=== Music video ===
A music video for "Georgy Porgy" was directed by Canadian music video director Little X.

=== Track listings ===
UK CD1

1. "Georgy Porgy" (radio edit) – 4:19
2. "Georgy Porgy" (So So Def radio remix with rap) – 3:56
3. "Georgy Porgy" (Somethin' for the People remix) – 4:45
4. "Georgy Porgy" (So So Def radio remix without rap) – 3:34

UK CD2

1. "Georgy Porgy" (album version) – 4:40
2. "Georgy Porgy" (Spreadlove's 2 step vocal mix) – 6:21
3. "Georgy Porgy" (Hippie Torales radio remix) – 3:24

UK 12-inch single

A1. "Georgy Porgy" (Hippie Torales remix) – 6:14
B1. "Georgy Porgy" (Spreadlove's 2 step vocal mix) – 6:21
B2. "Georgy Porgy" (Spreadlove's Demonic dub) – 5:35

European CD single

1. "Georgy Porgy" (radio edit) – 4:19
2. "Georgy Porgy" (Hippie Torales remix) – 6:14

Australian CD single

1. "Georgy Porgy" (radio edit)
2. "Georgy Porgy" (Hippie Torales radio remix)
3. "Georgy Porgy" (Hani's Fresh Air remix)
4. "Georgy Porgy" (Roy Davis Jr. Heavenly Body remix)
5. "Georgy Porgy" (Hippie Torrales remix)
6. "Georgy Porgy" (Roy Davis Jr. Galactic Soul remix)

Japanese CD single

1. "Georgy Porgy" (radio edit) – 4:19
2. "Georgy Porgy" (K.D.'s club dub) – 6:49
3. "Georgy Porgy" (a cappella) – 4:18
4. "Georgy Porgy" (instrumental) – 4:40
5. "Georgy Porgy" (album version) – 4:40

=== Charts ===
==== Weekly charts ====
Chart (1999)	Peak position
Belgium (Ultratip Bubbling Under Flanders)	15
France (SNEP)	40
Germany (GfK)	82
Netherlands (Dutch Top 40)	33
Netherlands (Single Top 100)	33
New Zealand (Recorded Music NZ)	2
Sweden (Sverigetopplistan)	36
Scottish Singles Sales (Official Charts)	99
UK Singles (Official Charts)	28
UK Dance (Official Charts)	10
UK Hip Hop/R&B (Official Charts)	8
US Billboard Hot 100	55
US Dance Singles Sales (Billboard)	6
US Hot R&B/Hip-Hop Songs (Billboard)	15
US Rhythmic Airplay (Billboard)	31

==== Year-end charts ====
Chart (1999)	Position
UK Urban (Music Week)	7
New Zealand (RIANZ)	43
US Hot R&B/Hip-Hop Singles & Tracks (Billboard)	54
US Maxi-Singles Sales (Billboard)	37

=== Release history ===
Region	Date	Format(s)	Label(s)	Ref.
United States	February 8, 1999	Urban radio	Warner Bros.	
United States	March 16, 1999	Rhythmic contemporary radio	Warner Bros.	
Japan	March 25, 1999	CD	Warner Bros.	
United Kingdom	April 19, 1999	12-inch vinyl; CD	Warner Bros.	
