= Hold the Line =

1978 single by Toto

Single by Toto

from the album Toto
- B-side: "Takin' It Back"
- Released: September 1978
- Recorded: 1978
- Studio: Studio 55 (Los Angeles)
- Genre: Arena rock; hard rock; pop rock; yacht rock
- Length: 3:29 (single version); 3:56 (album version)
- Label: Columbia
- Songwriter: David Paich
- Producer: Toto

Toto singles chronology
"Hold the Line" (1978)	"I'll Supply the Love" (1979)

Alternative cover
- German version

"Hold the Line" is a song recorded by American rock band Toto for their 1978 eponymous debut studio album. It was written by the band's keyboardist David Paich, and lead vocals were performed by Bobby Kimball.

"Hold the Line" was released by Columbia Records as the lead single from the Toto album in September 1978, also being Toto's debut single. It became an international hit for the band, reaching number 5 on the Billboard Hot 100 and number 14 on the UK singles chart.

== Background and writing ==
Keyboardist David Paich said that the song was relatively easy to develop. He began with the piano riff, which would become the song's intro and chorus. After toying with the piano riff one night, he started singing "Hold the line, love isn't always on time", and found the lyric to be a suitable fit. The verses were subsequently finished two hours later.

The phrase "hold the line" refers to placing a telephone on hold: when Paich was in high school, he was juggling three girlfriends, and they all called at the same time, so he had to place them on hold to talk to the next one:

On "Hold the Line," my parents were the first ones on my block to get a rotary phone. You guys can't remember that, because this is a digital age now, but a rotary phone, when you have more than one line, there are buttons on the phone so more people can call and it rolls over - that's why they call them "rotary phones." Well, when I was in high school, all of a sudden the phone started ringing off the hook, and I had a situation where I was at the dinner table and I had three girls all call at the same time, so all the lights were flashing. I was kind of juggling girlfriends, and that's how that came about.

Jeff Porcaro discussed "Hold the Line" in a 1988 interview with Modern Drummer:

"That was me trying to play like Sly Stone's original drummer, Greg Errico, who played drums on "Hot Fun In The Summertime." The hi-hat is doing triplets, the snare drum is playing 2 and 4 backbeats, and the bass drum is on 1 and the & of 2. That 8th note on the second beat is an 8th-note triplet feel, pushed. When we did the tune, I said, "Gee, this is going to be a heavy four-on-the-floor rocker, but we want a Sly groove." The triplet groove of the tune was David's writing. It was taking the Sly groove and meshing it with a harder rock caveman approach."

The song is in the key of F# minor and features a guitar solo after the second chorus played by guitarist Steve Lukather. The guitar solo was played in one take with the exception of the ending. Lukather had expressed dissatisfaction with the last part of the solo and thus worked with Paich to develop ideas for the final guitar lick. Paich wanted the final section of the solo to feature extensive harmonies, so Lukather multitracked his part to achieve this.

Lukather recalled his reaction to hearing "Hold the Line" on the radio.

I flipped the first time I heard myself on the radio. My mom called me up and said, "Turn on KLOS." It was the song "Hold the Line," and I started running around the house in my underwear, screaming, "I'm on the radio!" My wife was cracking up. It was just a thrill.

== Critical reception ==
Cashbox said it has a "simple emphatic piano part, heavy surging guitars, pleasant turns, fine singing and strong chorus." Billboard said that "Kimball's exciting vocals and the scorching instrumentals highlight this tune that also boasts a scorching mix and a solid hook."

Classic Rock History critic Brian Kachejian rated it as Toto's second-greatest song, saying that "The song's mesmerizing opening lick became one of the most eagerly learned piano runs that all pianists had to learn instantly."

== Live performances ==
"Hold the Line" has been a live staple at Toto shows. Steve Lukather played the song live with Ringo Starr & His All-Starr Band during tours from 2012 to the present. Bobby Kimball has performed the song on all of his solo tours since 2009.

== Personnel ==
Adapted from Toto album liner notes.

Toto

- Bobby Kimball – lead and backing vocals
- Steve Lukather – guitars, backing vocals
- David Paich – piano, backing vocals
- Steve Porcaro – synthesizers
- David Hungate – bass
- Jeff Porcaro – drums

Additional musician

- Lenny Castro – tambourine

Production

- Dana Latham – recording/tracking
- Gabe Veltri – recording/tracking
- Tom Knox – mixing
- Mike Reese – mastering
- Ron Hitchcock – mastering

== Release history ==
Region	Date	Ref.
United States	September 1978	
United Kingdom	November 10, 1978	
Australia	December 18, 1978	
United Kingdom	January 26, 1979 (re-release)	

== Charts ==
=== Weekly charts ===
Chart (1978–1979)	Peak position
Australia (Kent Music Report)	8
Canada Top Singles (RPM)	5
Netherlands (Single Top 100)	25
Ireland (IRMA)	24
New Zealand (Recorded Music NZ)	11
Sweden (Sverigetopplistan)	3
UK Singles (Official Charts)	14
US Billboard Hot 100	5
US Cash Box Top 100	5
West Germany (GfK)	23

Chart (2024–2025)	Peak position
Greece International (IFPI)	92
Poland (Polish Airplay Top 100)	63

=== Year-end charts ===
Chart (1979)	Rank
Australia (Kent Music Report)	66
Canada Top Singles (RPM)	62
South African Singles Chart	7
US Billboard Hot 100	44
US Cash Box Top 100	41

== Certifications ==
Region	Certification	Certified units/sales
Australia (ARIA)	Platinum	70,000^{‡}
Canada (Music Canada)	Gold	75,000^{^}
Denmark (IFPI Danmark)	Platinum	90,000^{‡}
Italy (FIMI)	Platinum	100,000^{‡}
New Zealand (RMNZ)	4× Platinum	120,000^{‡}
Spain (Promusicae)	Platinum	60,000^{‡}
United Kingdom (BPI)	Platinum	600,000^{‡}
United States (RIAA)	3× Platinum	3,000,000^{‡}
Streaming
Greece (IFPI Greece)	Platinum	2,000,000^{†}
^{^} Shipments figures based on certification alone.^{‡} Sales+streaming figures based on certification alone.^{†} Streaming-only figures based on certification alone.

== Cover versions ==
In 1979, Millie Jackson included a version of the song on her Live & Uncensored album, recorded live at the Roxy Theatre in Los Angeles, California.

In 1981, Bosnian-born Serbian singer Zdravko Čolić released a cover version of this song in the Serbian language, with lyrics "Oktobar je, počinje sezona kiša" ("This is October, the rain season begins"). Belgian blues band Blue Blot covered the song on their third studio album Where Do We Go (1992).

In 2018, German hard rock band Bonfire covered the song on their album Legends.
