= Connie Doepke =

American politician (born 1946)

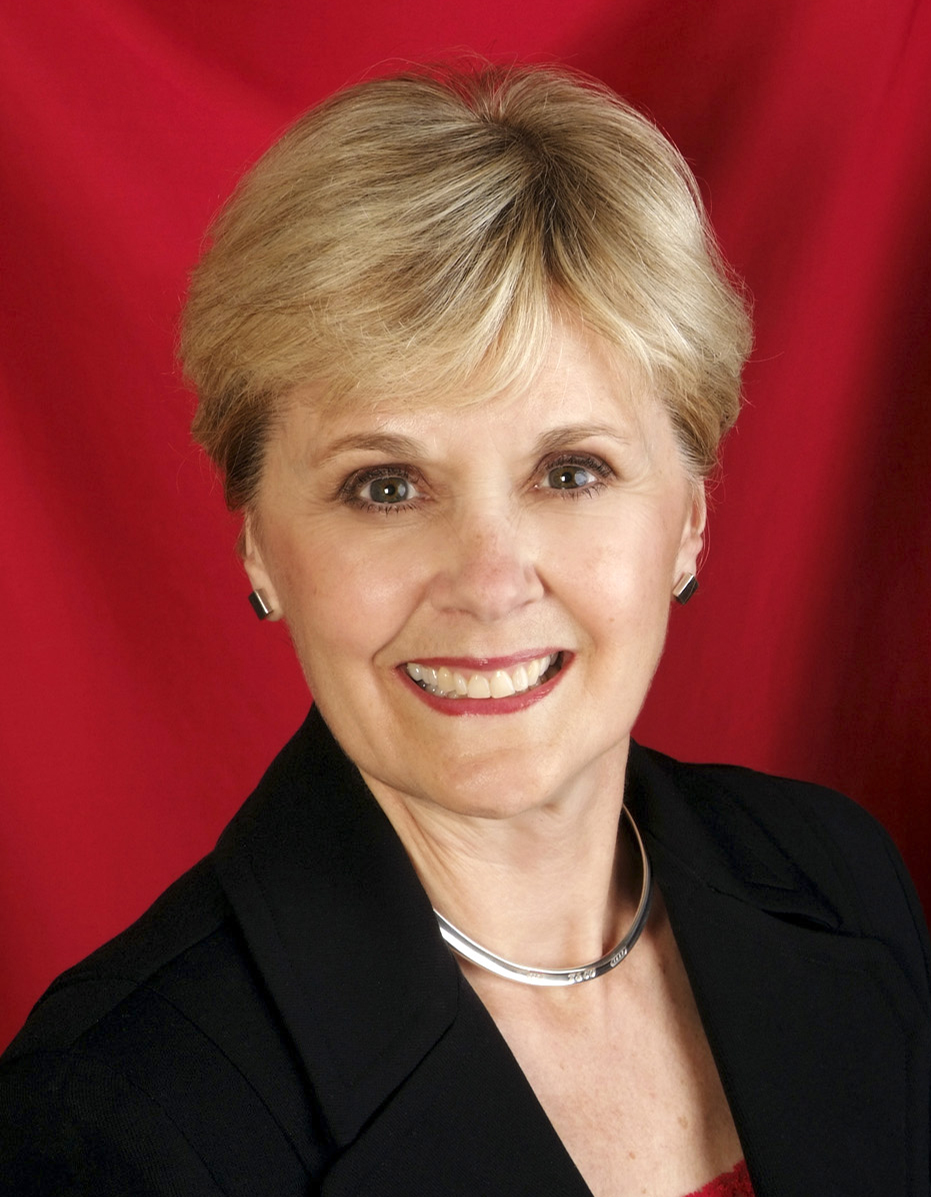

Member of the Minnesota House of Representatives from the 33B district
- In office January 6, 2009 – January 7, 2013
- Preceded by: John Berns
- Succeeded by: Cindy Pugh (redistricted)

Personal details
- Born: 1946 (age 79–80) Michigan
- Party: Republican
- Spouse: Mark
- Children: 2
- Education: Michigan State University
- Profession: consultant, fashion merchandising, legislator

Connie M. Doepke (born 1946) is a Minnesota politician and former member of the Minnesota House of Representatives representing District 33B, which included the Lake Minnetonka area cities of Deephaven, Excelsior, Greenwood, Long Lake, Minnetonka Beach, Orono, Shorewood, Tonka Bay, Wayzata, Woodland, and western Minnetonka in Hennepin County, which is part of the Twin Cities metropolitan area. A Republican, she is also a direct marketing consultant, and a former vice president of fashion merchandising for Fingerhut.

Doepke was first elected in 2008, succeeding first-term Rep. John Berns, who did not seek re-election. She was re-elected in 2010. She was a member of the House's K-12 Education Policy and Oversight Committee, of the Commerce and Labor Subcommittee for the Telecommunications Regulation and Infrastructure Division, and of the Finance subcommittees for the K-12 Education Finance Division and the Transportation Finance and Policy Division.

Doepke graduated from Michigan State University in East Lansing, earning her B.A. in Communication Arts. Prior to moving to Wayzata in 1993, she also lived in Chicago, Illinois, and New York City, working as an executive and consultant in the direct marketing and fashion merchandising industries for Sears, Roebuck and Company, Avon Products, and New Hampton, Inc.

Active in her local community, Doepke served as a board member, chair, vice chair and treasurer of the Wayzata School Board, and also chaired the school district's Citizens Financial Advisory Committee and Legislative Action Committee. She is a board member of the TwinWest Chamber of Commerce, and has served as co-chair of the Business/Education Partnership. She is also a member of the Minneapolis Chapter of Fashion Group International. In 2007, Governor Tim Pawlenty appointed her to serve on the board of the Minnesota Humanities Center.
