= Westonka =

Westonka is a portmanteau of "west" and "Minnetonka", referring to the towns around the west third of Lake Minnetonka in Minnesota, roughly 25 miles west of Minneapolis. Several small suburbs comprise the Westonka School District and Westonka is also used in the name of the local (Mound) library and other regional organizations, institutions and businesses. Actor Kevin Sorbo is originally from Westonka. Mound is the city in Westonka with the largest population and is its anchor, its downtown.

== Westonka School District ==
The Westonka School District was previously called the Mound School District, and its students are from Mound, Spring Park, Navarre, Orono, Minnetrista, and Shorewood.

== Westonka Historical Society ==
The Westonka Historical Society has a significant collection of articles from the area. Major holdings include Tonka Toys artifacts, Andrews Sisters memorabilia and old photos and maps.
