= Crane Island =

Crane Island may refer to:

- Crane Island (Washington), US
- Crane Island Historic District, Minnesota, US
- Crane Island, former island in Cappagh, County Westmeath, Ireland
