= Crane Island Historic District =

Historic district in Minnesota, United States

- U.S. National Register of Historic Places
- U.S. Historic district
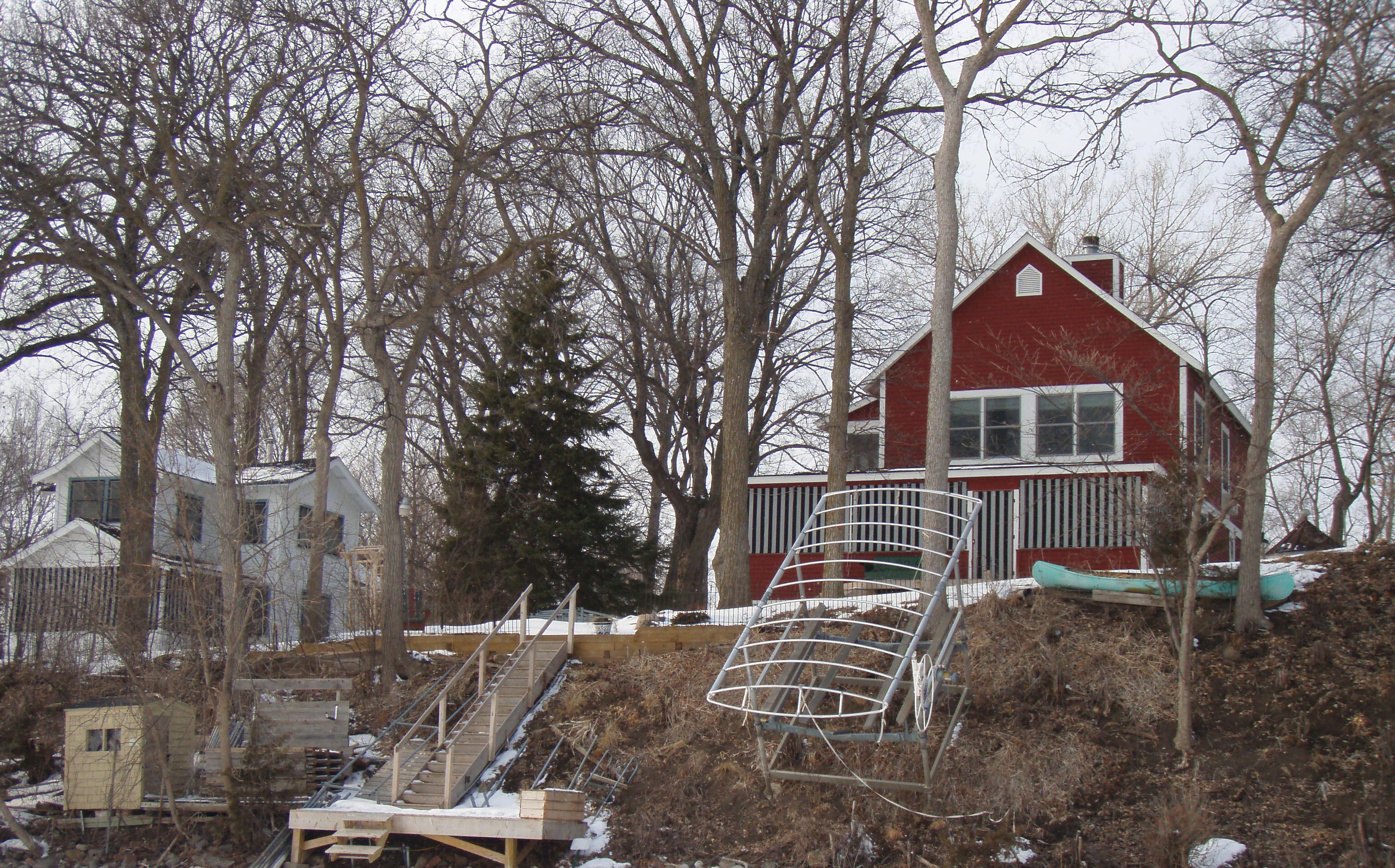

- Location within Minnesota Location within the United States
- Location: Minnetrista, Minnesota
- Coordinates: 44°54′2″N 93°39′43″W
- Area: 9.6 acres (3.9 ha)
- Built: 1907–1940
- NRHP reference No.: 91001005
- Added to NRHP: August 5, 1991

The Crane Island Historic District is a historic district of vacation properties on Crane Island in Lake Minnetonka, part of the city of Minnetrista, Minnesota, United States. It consists of a number of private residential summer cottages and some communal amenities. Although it was originally developed by parishioners of the Presbyterian Church, it is now a secular association that welcomes all. The island was designated a historic district and listed on the National Register of Historic Places in 1991.

Lake Minnetonka had been a popular recreation area after the American Civil War, drawing vacationers from the eastern and southern United States and later from Minneapolis as it grew. Crane Island had escaped development because it had been a heron rookery. A storm in 1906 blew down most of the trees from the center of the island. The herons moved to the nearby Wawatasso Island. Charles E. Woodward had been spending his summer vacation in the nearby town of Mound, and he explored the island after the storm out of curiosity. He figured the land would be ideal for cottages, so he organized a group from Bethlehem Presbyterian Church and formed the Crane Island Association.

The association bought the island and surveyed a number of lots for development. The association established a commons area in the center of the island with a caretaker's lodge, an icehouse, and a tennis court. The commons area was modeled on the kind of commons in New England, where all neighbors would use common grazing land. Owners of the cottages could take the Great Northern Railway to the depots at Mound or Spring Park and then charter a private boat to the island. The yellow streetcar boats of Twin City Rapid Transit also made two daily stops at the island between mid-May and September.

Writer Marjorie Myers Douglas spent summers on the island from 1917, when she was five years old, until she had finished college. Her book Barefoot on Crane Island chronicles many of her personal experiences with summers she spent on the island.

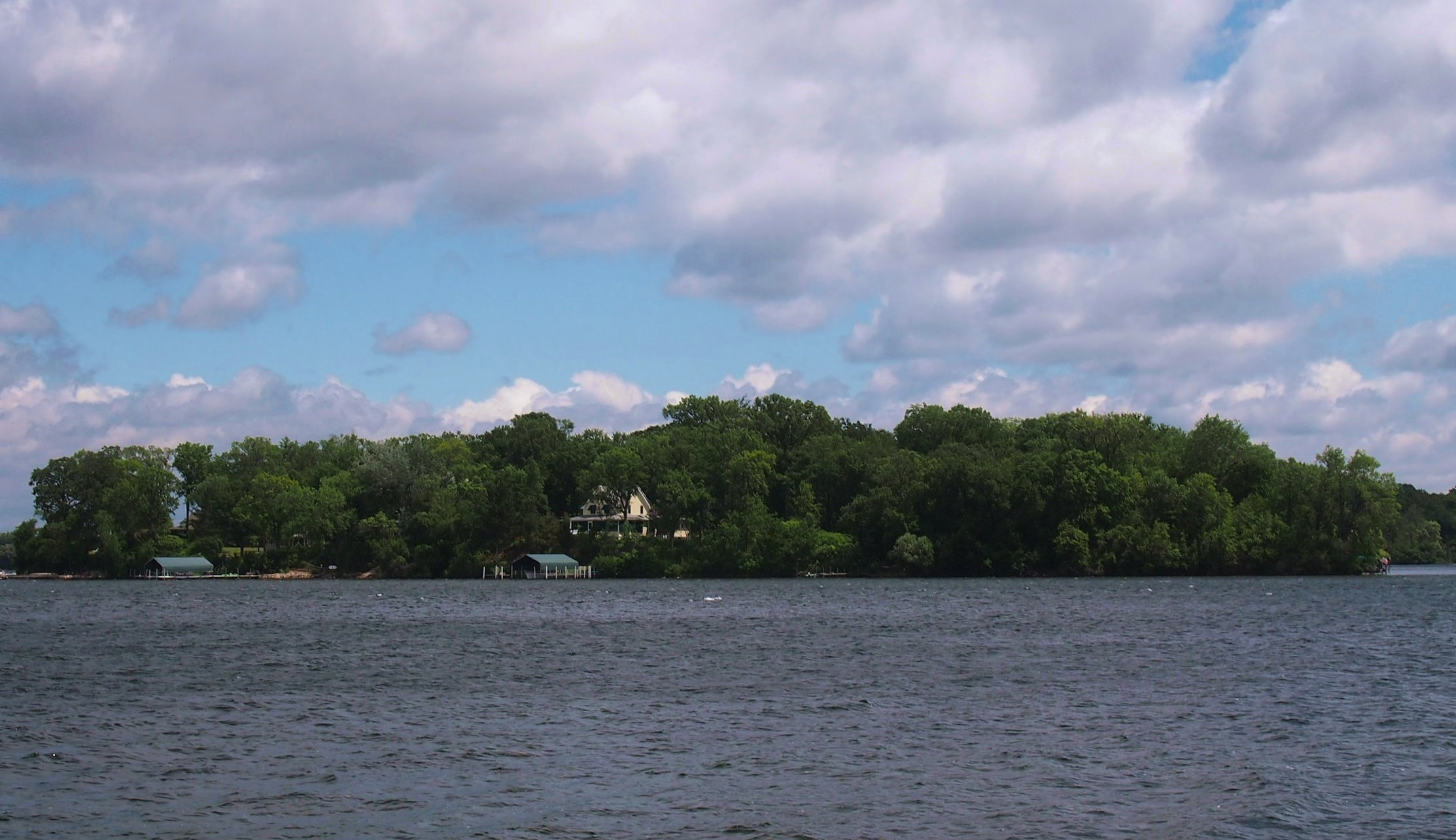
Crane Island from the southwest
