= Thompson Summer House =

Historic house in Minnesota, United States

- U.S. National Register of Historic Places
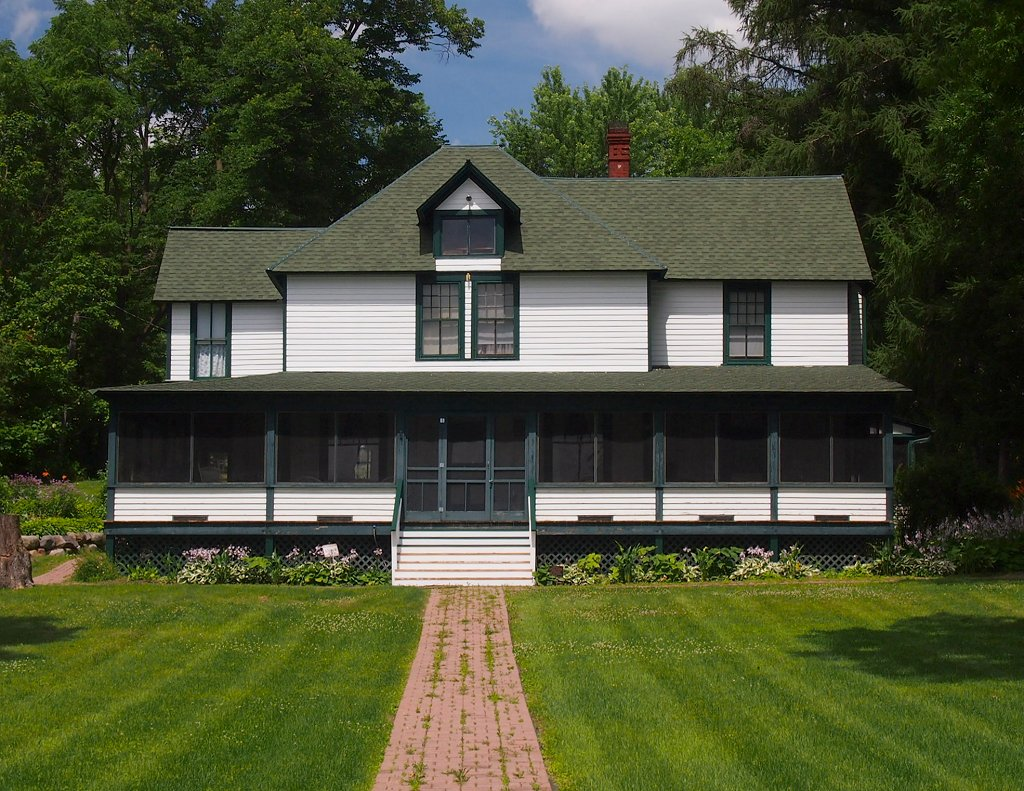
- The Thompson Summer House from the south-southeast.

- Location within Minnesota Location within the United States
- Location: 3012 Shoreline Dr., Minnetonka Beach, Minnesota
- Coordinates: 44°56′20″N 93°35′59″W
- Built: 1887
- NRHP reference No.: 97001652
- Added to NRHP: January 15, 1998

The Thompson Summer House is a house in Minnetonka Beach, Minnesota, United States, listed on the National Register of Historic Places. It is located on Hennepin County Road 15, across from Lafayette Bay on Lake Minnetonka.

The house was built in 1887 for Charles Telford Thompson, an attorney and civil leader, and his wife. It was listed on the National Register as a typical example of the types of Queen Anne summer homes that middle and upper-class Minneapolis residents owned on Lake Minnetonka during the end of the 19th century. An identical house owned by Samuel A. Harris, Charles Thompson's brother-in-law, once sat adjacent to the Thompson Summer House, but was demolished in 1968.

In the 1990s, the house faced deterioration from erosion and rot. In an effort to stabilize the foundation and rebuild the wraparound porch while preserving the character of the house, the owners undertook a major restoration project. The project, conducted by Wes Foss, the husband of Thompson's great-great-granddaughter Debbie, was featured on a three-part episode of Hometime on PBS and won an award from the Preservation Alliance of Minnesota in 2005.

The house is currently one of the oldest extant summer houses on Lake Minnetonka and is in excellent condition. It is still used strictly as a summer home (as it has always been) and frequently hosts family gatherings.
