= Wayzata Bay Wreck =

Barge that sank in Lake Minnetonka, Minnesota

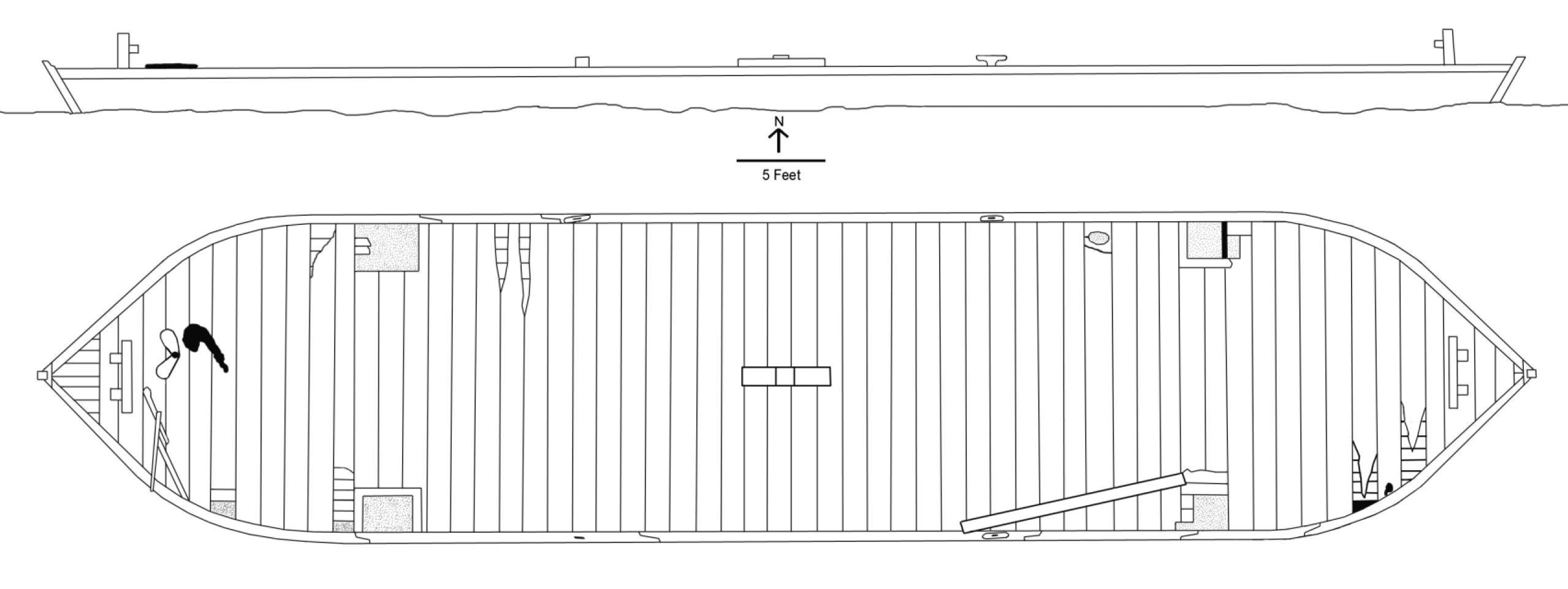
- Profile and plan view of the Wayzata Bay Wreck, the only complete model barge wreck in the United States.

History

United States
- Name: Unknown
- Owner: James J. Hill
- Operator: Hill & Acker
- Launched: 1876
- Fate: Sank in storm September 30, 1879
- Status: Wreck on lake bottom

General characteristics
- Type: Wooden model barge
- Length: 85 ft (26 m)
- Beam: 18.5 ft (5.6 m)
- Wayzata Bay Wreck
- U.S. National Register of Historic Places
- Location within Minnesota
- Coordinates: 44.9682°N 93.5158°W
- MPS: Wrecks and Submerged Cultural Resources of Lake Minnetonka, Minnesota (BC 9500 - AD 1965)
- NRHP reference No.: 16000386
- Added to NRHP: June 20, 2016
- Discovery date: 2011
- Site number: 21-HE-401

Wayzata Bay Wreck is a wooden barge that sank in Lake Minnetonka, Minnesota, in 1879. It is located in Wayzata Bay about 40 feet (12 m) underwater. The wreck was listed on the National Register of Historic Places in 2016.

== History ==
The barge was built in 1876 and measured 85 feet (26 m) long and 18.5 feet (5.6 m) wide. It was owned by James J. Hill, founder of the Great Northern Railway. The barge was used to haul cordwood and lumber from the shores of Lake Minnetonka to rail terminals.

On September 30, 1879, a storm struck the lake and the barge sank in Wayzata Bay. It was left on the lake bottom and never recovered.

"Monday night's storm was a lively on at Lake Minnetonka. A barge was sunk and a small steamer was capsized near Wayzata"

— The St. Paul Globe (October 1, 1879)

== Discovery ==
The wreck was found in 2011 by Maritime Heritage Minnesota during a survey of Lake Minnetonka. It lies about 40 feet (12 m) below the surface, encased in silt. The cold freshwater and mud preserved the wooden hull, making it the best-preserved of three known model barge wrecks in the United States.

== Archaeological research and preservation ==
Maritime Heritage Minnesota documented the wreck using sonar and underwater photography. Divers recorded hull details and cargo remains. The site is protected under state law, and removal of artifacts is prohibited. The National Register listing helps preserve the wreck and supports historical research.

== Significance ==
The wreck is the oldest known shipwreck in Lake Minnetonka and the only complete model barge wreck in the United States. It was added to the National Register of Historic Places in 2016. The listing was funded by a Minnesota Historical and Cultural Heritage Grant.

== See also ==
- Wayzata, Minnesota
