= Nylint =

American toy company

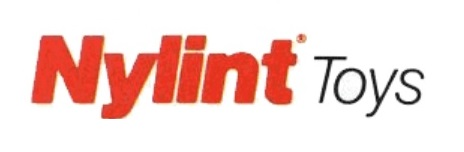
Nylint Logo

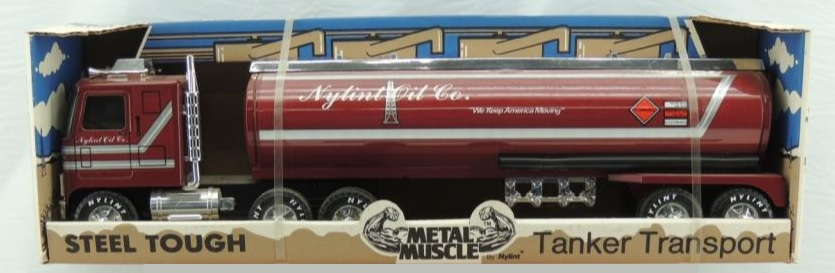
Nylint GMC Tanker (Nylint Oil-Co)

The Nylint Corporation is an American company that produces model toys. It was founded in 1937 by brothers Bernard and Ragnar Klint, and David Nyberg of Rockford, Illinois. Their uncle, David Nyberg, supplied much of the initial capital to start the company. The company name of Nylint is a combination of both the Nyberg and Klint names. It was incorporated under the name “Nylint Tool and Manufacturing” and its initial operation was located at 5th Avenue and 13th Street in Rockford. Bernard (known as Barney) Klint and his wife Grace remained actively involved for nearly 60 years in this privately held company until their deaths in the mid-1990s.

== History ==
Looking back on Nylint's 60-plus year history, they survived by constantly evolving – changing their direction to meet the demands of the diverse toy market. One can see at least eight phases of their history. These phases, or “eras,” often overlap.

=== Early years ===
The company began (1st Phase pre-World War II) producing kitchen utensils. Nylint also did special-order tooling work for other companies. For example, they produced refrigerator door handles and cast aluminum parts for the automobile industry. In 1940, the company moved to a larger factory 16th Avenue where it remained for 60 years.

As with most manufacturers, World War II caused a shift to making war-related products. During the war years, Nylint prospered while employing 50 employees who made anti-aircraft magazines and torpedo-related components for the Federal government. Nylint produced, almost exclusively, war-related products during 1941–1945.

After the war, Nylint worked to establish its post-war direction. After an extensive study in late 1945, the company decided upon toy production. This decision was made primarily because of Nylint's modern metal-stamping facilities. Nylint hired Carl Swenson, the inventor of a wind-up toy car with steering and directional actions, based on the Chrysler Airflow design. Nylint called this the “Amazing Car.” When introduced at the 1946 Toy Fair in New York City, it was a huge success with over 100,000 units ordered. Nylint had a solid product, and it was marketed well — being packaged in an attractive box with a color picture of the toy on the outside. Also, the box included a diagram of the detailed motions the toy could perform. After World War II there were several large manufacturers of pressed-steel toys in this country. In addition to Nylint, Tonka, Buddy-L, Structo, Smith-Miller, Doepke, Marx, and Wyandotte were some of the most successful. Others, including Tru-Scale, All-American, and Ertl, later joined the ranks of toy truck producers. Aside from Buddy-L, Marx, Structo, and Wyandotte, who had previously made toys, most of these companies started moving into toy manufacturing immediately after the war.

=== 1940s to 1950s ===
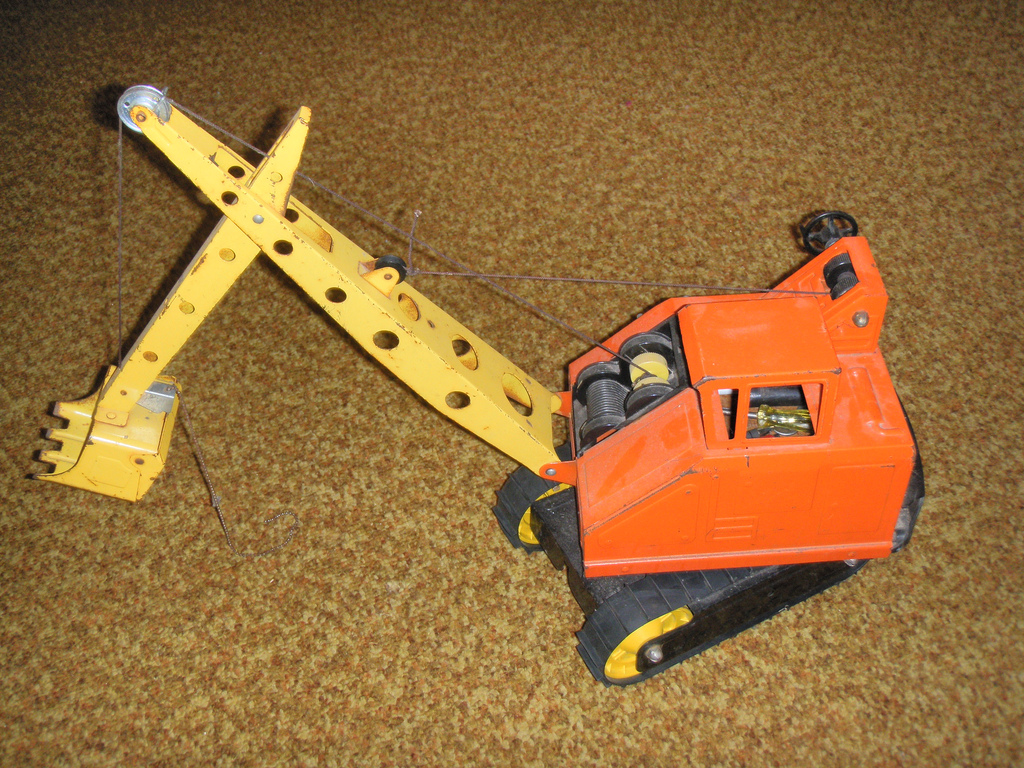
An early toy power shovel by Nylint

In the late-1940s and early-1950s, Nylint remained committed to wind-up toys and soon produced a front-end loader wind-up which resembled a forklift. They then designed and built a couple of motorcycle tin wind-ups, a street sweeper wind-up (resembling an Elgin machine) and a wind-up that resembled a popular TV icon -- Howdy Doody—although Nylint never used the name to advertise the toy. The Elgin Street Sweeper demonstrated the success of toys patterned after real-life vehicles.

In 1951 Nylint started to make high-quality construction toys that were patterned after real construction machinery. The first construction toy was patterned after the Tournarocker made by the R.G. LeTourneau Company. While it was high-quality, it did not have the high price of toys made by Smith-Miller and Doepke. Smith-Miller and Doepke, because of increased competition, were soon forced out of business. Nylint also introduced a second heavy construction toy in 1951, a large high-quality road grader. This toy, while realistic, wasn't patterned after any specific manufacturer's grader, although it did resemble an Adams grader of the day.

Through the mid-1960s, Nylint produced toys patterned after manufacturers such as LeTourneau (now part of Cameron International), the J.D. Adams & Company of Indianapolis, the Frank G. Hough Company of Libertyville, Illinois, the Pettibone-Mulliken Corp. of Chicago, the Austin-Western Works of Aurora, Illinois, and the Clark Equipment Company of Benton Harbor, Michigan. Nylint made their toys as realistic as possible, and they gave credit to the real-life manufacturers. By the early-1950s, demand for quality toys was paramount as the first wave of post-war baby boomer boys (and girls) were hitting the ages of four to eight. Disposable income was high, and the demand for pressed-steel trucks and other toys was at an all-time high.

For several years in the early to mid-1950s, Nylint made construction pieces exclusively. In 1956, Nylint started to take advantage of the Cold War military craze. They made several missile-launching gun toys and made an uncharacteristic plastic ballistic missile set. These military toys had many operating features and sold well. Nylint also made a couple of battery-operated toys in this period including a modified version of the Elgin Street sweeper and a military Electronic Cannon truck.

During the late 1950s, Nylint's construction toys, while high-quality and realistic, moved away slightly from the requirement that the toy be a replica of real-world equipment. After the cold war phase ended in the early 1960s, Nylint returned to its strict “realistic” formula. Other toy companies were moving in the opposite direction—going to more generic or futuristic looking toys not patterned after real vehicles. This phase began around 1959 and peaked about 1965 when Ford toys dominated the Nylint product line. This era lasted throughout the 1960s into the early-1970s. By 1962, Nylint was producing Ford toy replicas for Ford dealership promotions. Nylint was building excellent renditions of the Ford F-100 line of trucks, the Ford “C” tilt-cab, and the smaller Econoline series. By the mid-1960s the company also made a replica of the Ford Bronco. Nylint was blatant about using the Ford label on its toys, stamping “Ford” on tailgates, above the grille, on hubcaps, depicting the Ford “Twin-I-Beam” badge, and a detailed hood decal. Some of these Ford toys were exclusives for Ford dealers, such as a Nylint pickup replica of a camper that housed a Philco AM radio, and was an enticement to bring parents into dealerships.

During this phase, in addition to the Ford trucks and pickups, there were several Nylint Ford jalopy hot rods made.

=== 1966 to 1976 ===
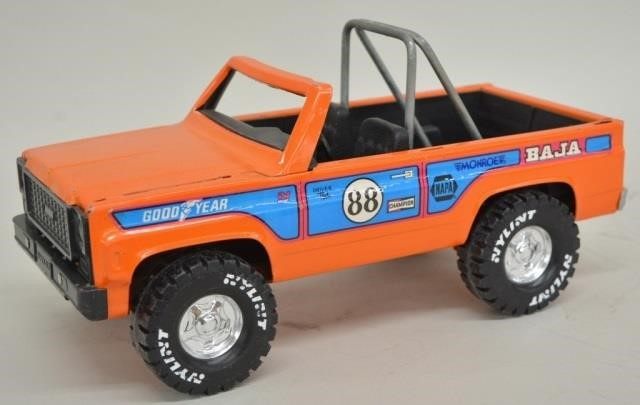
Nylint Chevrolet Blazer Baja

Nylint then moved away from realistic Ford trucks to more modern-looking toys—some with futuristic styling. This “Mod Styling Era” phase started about 1966, and by 1968 was a significant part of the Nylint Product line. Nylint's Ford toy trucks, while still being manufactured to resemble a full-scale truck, lost some of their Ford detail identity. “Ford” was removed from hubcaps and the Ford hood decal disappeared. New toys introduced were either of the “turbine” cab style or other modern 1970s look. Many were painted in the then-popular fluorescent colors. As part of the marketing strategy, many toys in this era were being geared towards girls with brightly painted color schemes and animal accessories. Although toys from this era may not be as collectible as earlier toys, Nylint's profits during this period showed their willingness to change with the market.

By 1974, Nylint had only one truck that resembled a Ford, the Ford U-Haul Maxi-Mover. All the rest of its line was generic or of the “Mod” look. In 1974 Nylint introduced a few realistic toy models patterned after the Chevrolet truck cab.

After the mid-1970s, Nylint began producing Private Label Collectibles. The company continued to have some generic toys among its products as well as toys patterned after Chevy trucks. For an additional 25 years Nylint made many realistic toys patterned after real-world trucks using actual corporate logos. Nylint made toy replica truck/trailer rigs for hundreds of companies. Most of these rigs used a truck cab resembling a GMC Cabover or a Conventional Freightliner, although a newer Ford Conventional cab was used as well. Nylint, in the mid-'70s, was one of the first toy manufacturers to produce collectibles and it was a significant part of their output during their last 25 years. Nylint continued to make many other “non-collectible” toys during this period, as well.

=== 1970s to 1990s ===
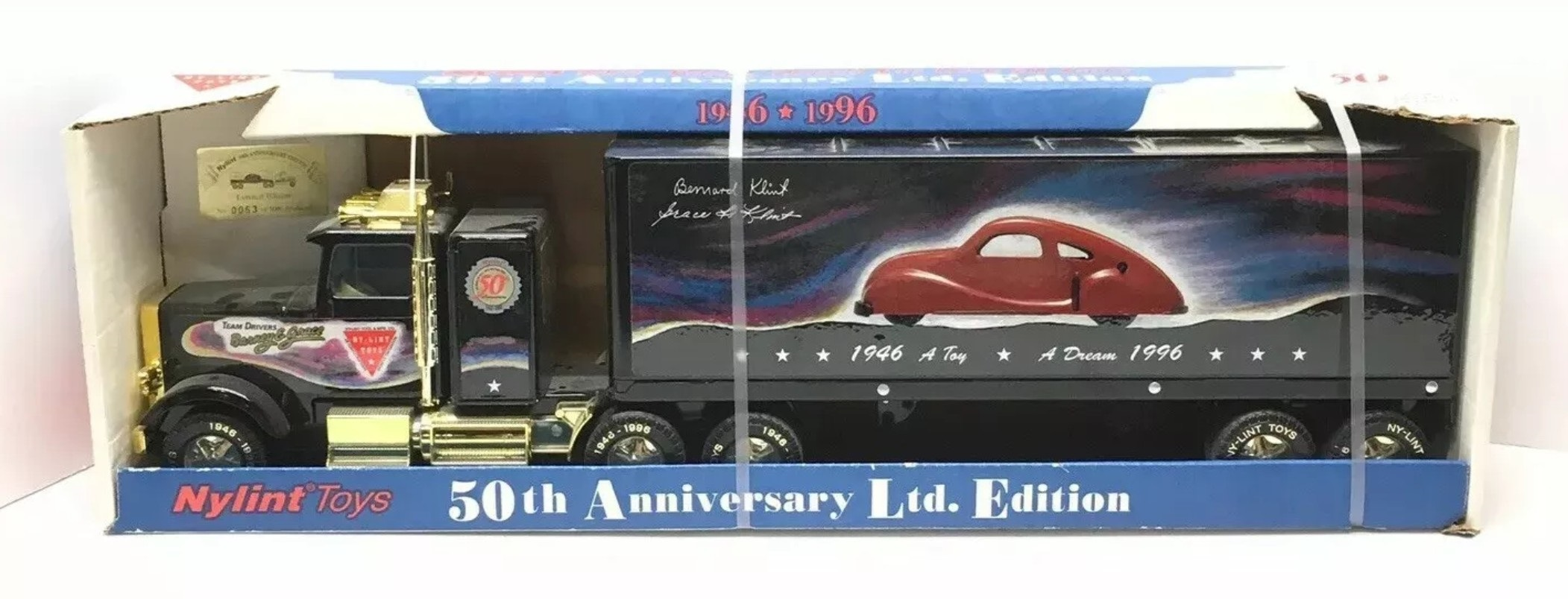
Nylint Freightliner 50th Anniversary Truck

Through the 1970s and into the 21st century, Nylint had continued to make pressed-steel trucks. Most of the other popular pressed-steel producers had gone out of business, were bought by larger companies, or entered other toy-making arenas. They released a series of moderately successful Thomas the Tank Engine toys in the early to mid-1990s.

1996 Nylint Celebrate the 50th anniversary and relays a Limited Edition Freightliner 18-Wheeler.

In 1996 the Nylint Corporation would celebrate 50 years in the toy-making business but also lost their founder Bernard Klint, who died on September 2; his wife Grace died a year earlier on October 24, 1995. The company was left in the hands of their sons. Nylint continued to make pressed-steel toys.

== Decline ==
In January 2001, declining sales forced Nylint to file for Chapter 11 Bankruptcy protection, but some operations continued. In April 2001, Funrise Toy Corporation of California bought Nylint Corporation securing the rights to the Nylint branding. All of Nylint's new inventory and current toy molds were moved from the Rockford, Illinois headquarters to Funrise's operations, officially ending Nylint's production of toys. Finally, in June 2001, all remaining Nylint assets including many vintage toys, some metalworking machines, a few vehicles and office equipment were sold at auction at its headquarters in Rockford, Illinois. The facility was then shuttered. After an era of 55 years, Nylint toymaking had ended.

While firm employment numbers are elusive, it is believed Nylint employed nearly 400 people during its manufacturing peak in the early 1970s. But by the time Funrise had announced its purchase of Nylint, only about 80 people remained. Still, Nylint managed to remain a self-owned, independent toy company for a decade longer than one of its main competitors, Tonka Toys, which was bought by Hasbro in 1991. Hasbro still produces Tonka-branded toys.

A hydraulics business, which supplies parts for the construction vehicle industry, now occupies the former Nylint headquarters in Rockford.

== Nylint reappears briefly ==
The Nylint brand reappeared again in Summer of 2005. Funrise's creation was called the Nylint Rock Crawler; a remote controlled, four-wheel drive vehicle designed for rugged terrain. It was available in 1/6 scale and 1/18 scale. It enjoyed good sales and was produced until late 2007.

As of November 2012, no new Nylint branded toys were being produced until 2021.

== Collectors ==
Since the early 2000s, there has been an increase in the number of adult collectors.

== Relaunch ==
In 2020, the granddaughter of the company's original founder, Ragnar Klint, restarted Nylint. Emmy Klint was inspired to relaunch her family's business so that her son and other children could enjoy high quality toys with an educational twist. Along with the relaunch of the steel toy trucks and cars there will also be a book on the geography of America. Two special edition toys, Sunshine and Rain, inspired by original Nylint designs became readily available for purchase during the holiday season of 2021.
