= List of Minnesota area codes =

Minnesota numbering plan areas and area codes

Area code	Year created	Parent NPA	Overlay	Numbering plan area
218	1947	–		northern portion of the state
612	1947	–	–	Minneapolis, Richfield, Fort Snelling, and Saint Anthony
507	1954	218, 612	507/924	southern third of the state
924	2024	507	507/924	southern third of the state
320	1996	612	–	about the central third of the state except for the greater Minneapolis-Saint Paul area
651	1998	612	–	Saint Paul, eastern suburbs of the Minneapolis-Saint Paul metropolitan area, and communities along the Mississippi River down to Wabasha
763	2000	612	–	northwestern suburbs of Minneapolis
952	2000	612	–	southwestern suburbs of Minneapolis plus Apple Valley and Lakeville

== History ==
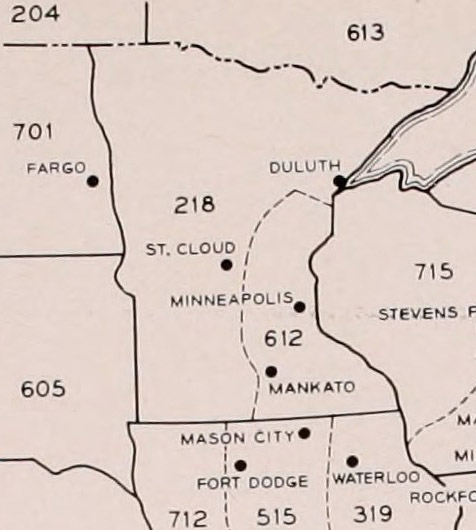
Original numbering plan areas and area codes of Minnesota in 1952

When the American Telephone and Telegraph Company (AT&T) created the first nationwide telephone numbering plan for Operator Toll Dialing in 1947 to automate and speed the connection of long-distance calls, the United States and Canada were divided into 86 geographic numbering plan areas (NPAs) and assigned the original North American area codes. Minnesota was divided into a south-eastern area including the Twin-Cities with area code 612 and the rest of the state in the south-west, north, and north-east with area code 218. In 1954, the southern half of 612 was designated a separate numbering plan area with area code 507 as the third area code for the state.

== See also ==
- List of North American Numbering Plan area codes
