= Woodland, Minnesota =

City in Minnesota, United States

- City
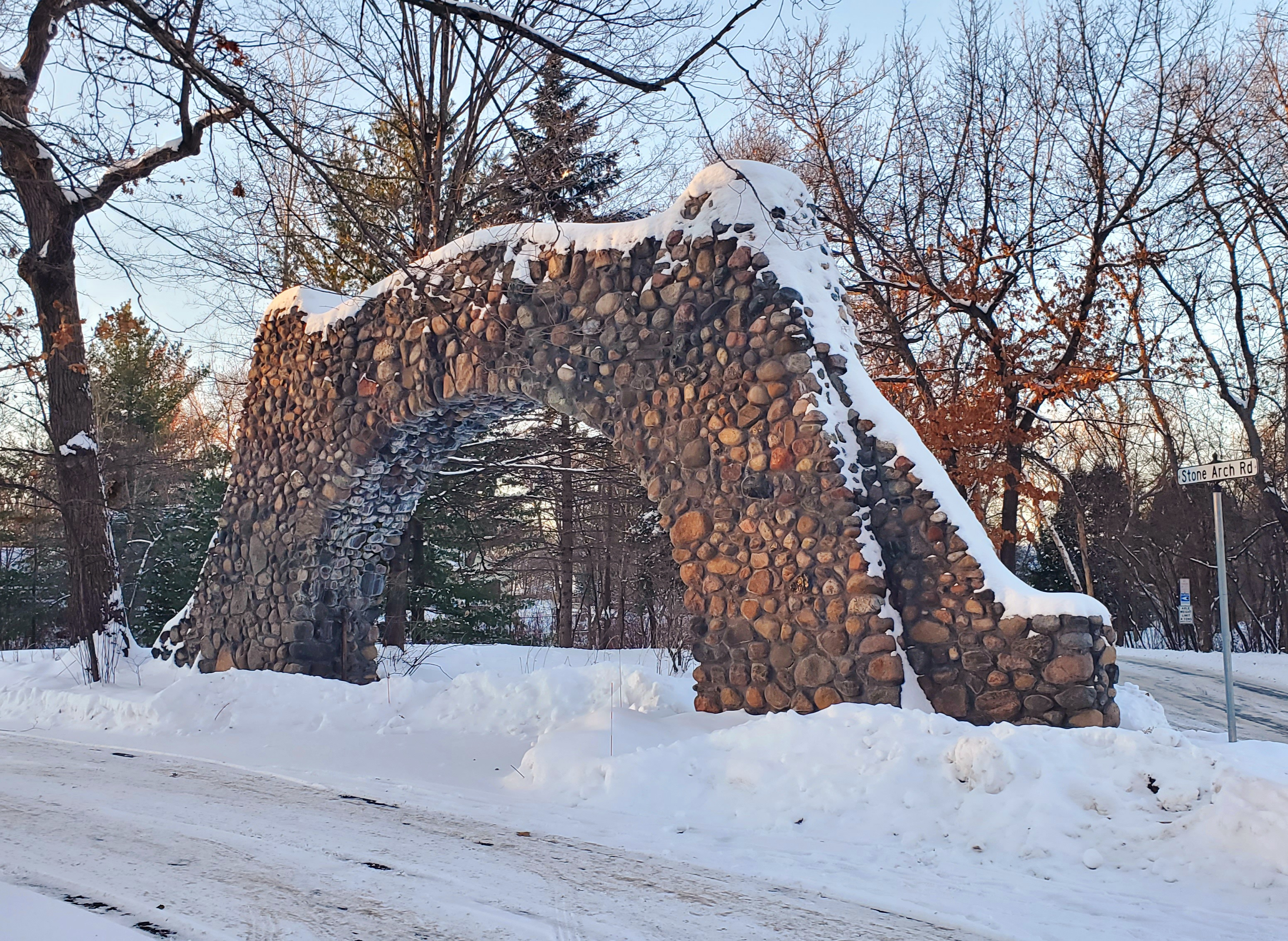
- The Old Stone Arch, originally part an estate designed by architect Harry Wild Jones around 1900, built using stones from Lake Minnetonka and restored in 2011.

- Logo

- Location of Woodland within Hennepin County, Minnesota
- Coordinates: 44°57′6″N 93°30′32″W
- Country: United States
- State: Minnesota
- County: Hennepin
- Settled: 1882
- Incorporated: 1948

Government
  - Mayor: Vince Suerth

Area
  - Total: 1.17 sq mi (3.02 km^{2})
  - Land: 0.58 sq mi (1.49 km^{2})
  - Water: 0.59 sq mi (1.53 km^{2})
- Elevation: 950 ft (290 m)

Population (2020)
  - Total: 384
  - Density: 667/sq mi (257.5/km^{2})
- Time zone: UTC-6 (Central (CST))
  - Summer (DST): UTC-5 (CDT)
- ZIP code: 55391
- Area code: 952
- FIPS code: 27-71500
- GNIS feature ID: 0654355
- Website: www.cityofwoodlandmn.org

Woodland is a city in Hennepin County, Minnesota, United States, with lake shore property on Lake Minnetonka. The population was 384 at the 2020 census. Woodland was incorporated as the independent village of Maplewoods in December 1948. It was renamed "Woodland" in 1949.

== Geography ==
According to the United States Census Bureau, the city has a total area of 0.62 square miles (1.61 km^{2}), of which 0.58 square miles (1.50 km^{2}) is land and 0.04 square miles (0.10 km^{2}) is water. County 101 serves as a main route.

== Demographics ==
Historical population
Census	Pop.	Note	%±
1950	411		—
1960	449		9.2%
1970	544		21.2%
1980	526		−3.3%
1990	496		−5.7%
2000	480		−3.2%
2010	437		−9.0%
2020	384		−12.1%
U.S. Decennial Census

=== 2010 census ===
As of the census of 2010, there were 437 people, 169 households, and 138 families living in the city. The population density was 753.4 inhabitants per square mile (290.9/km^{2}). There were 189 housing units at an average density of 325.9 per square mile (125.8/km^{2}). The racial makeup of the city was 98.2% White, 0.2% African American, 0.5% Asian, 0.2% from other races, and 0.9% from two or more races. Hispanic or Latino of any race were 2.3% of the population.

There were 169 households, of which 29.6% had children under the age of 18 living with them, 74.6% were married couples living together, 4.7% had a female householder with no husband present, 2.4% had a male householder with no wife present, and 18.3% were non-families. 16.0% of all households were made up of individuals, and 7.1% had someone living alone who was 65 years of age or older. The average household size was 2.59 and the average family size was 2.89.

The median age in the city was 51.8 years. 22.9% of residents were under the age of 18; 4.9% were between the ages of 18 and 24; 11.4% were from 25 to 44; 41.9% were from 45 to 64; and 18.8% were 65 years of age or older. The gender makeup of the city was 49.7% male and 50.3% female.

=== 2000 census ===
As of the census of 2000, there were 480 people, 173 households, and 144 families living in the city. The population density was 840.7 inhabitants per square mile (324.6/km^{2}). There were 188 housing units at an average density of 329.3 per square mile (127.1/km^{2}). The racial makeup of the city was 97.71% White, 0.42% Asian, 0.62% from other races, and 1.25% from two or more races. Hispanic or Latino of any race were 1.04% of the population.

There were 173 households, out of which 38.7% had children under the age of 18 living with them, 76.3% were married couples living together, 5.8% had a female householder with no husband present, and 16.2% were non-families. 13.3% of all households were made up of individuals, and 4.0% had someone living alone who was 65 years of age or older. The average household size was 2.77 and the average family size was 3.06.

In the city, the population was spread out, with 28.1% under the age of 18, 5.0% from 18 to 24, 18.3% from 25 to 44, 36.7% from 45 to 64, and 11.9% who were 65 years of age or older. The median age was 44 years. For every 100 females, there were 92.8 males. For every 100 females age 18 and over, there were 93.8 males.

The median income for a household in the city was $153,881, and the median income for a family was $175,000. Males had a median income of $100,000 versus $46,250 for females. The per capita income for the city was $95,495. About 3.8% of families and 4.6% of the population were below the poverty line, including 6.4% of those under age 18 and none of those age 65 or over.

== Politics ==
Presidential election results

Precinct General Election Results
Year	Republican	Democratic	Third parties
2024	44.4% 139	53.0% 166	2.6% 8
2020	48.8% 159	49.7% 162	1.5% 5
2016	47.8% 151	41.8% 132	10.4% 33
2012	63.3% 219	35.8% 124	0.9% 3
2008	53.5% 185	45.4% 157	1.1% 4
2004	60.3% 207	38.2% 131	1.5% 5
2000	65.1% 207	29.6% 94	5.3% 17
1996	64.5% 178	28.3% 78	7.2% 20
1992	54.6% 180	24.2% 80	21.2% 70
1988	75.8% 241	24.2% 77	0.0% 0
1984	78.2% 248	11.8% 69	0.0% 0
1980	69.3% 241	17.2% 60	13.5% 47
1976	78.5% 263	20.0% 67	1.5% 5
1972	75.3% 247	24.4% 80	1.3% 1
1968	77.9% 233	20.4% 61	1.7% 5
1964	71.7% 190	28.3% 75	0.0% 0
1960	83.0% 214	16.3% 42	0.7% 2
1956	82.4% 192	17.6% 41	0.0% 0
