= Doepke =

Doepke is a surname. Notable people with the surname include:

- Connie Doepke (born 1946), American politician
- Matthias Doepke, German economist

== See also ==
- Alms and Doepke Dry Goods Company
