= Maritime Heritage Minnesota =

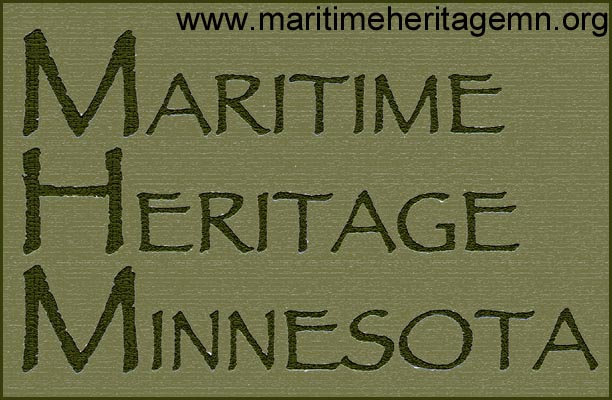

Maritime Heritage Minnesota (MHM) is a non-profit group working toward the documentation, preservation, and conservation of maritime archaeological and cultural resources. They were founded in July 2005.

MHM's goal is to educate students, scholars, and citizens about the importance of our maritime heritage and preserve or stabilize sites as needed to prevent deterioration and destruction, particularly from unlawful human activity. They also archive manuscript materials, books, and rare books concerning Minnesota’s maritime culture, nautical and maritime archaeological sites, and terrestrial archaeology.

Among the shipwrecks and maritime archaeological sites the MHM has been involved in are USS Essex located in Duluth. They have also been pursuing a project to map and identify shipwrecks in Lake Minnetonka.
