= Greenwood, Minnesota =

City in Minnesota, United States

- City
- Motto: "City On The Lake"
- Location of Greenwood within Hennepin County, Minnesota
- Coordinates: 44°54′41″N 93°33′16″W
- Country: United States
- State: Minnesota
- County: Hennepin
- Incorporated: 1956

Area
  - Total: 1.03 sq mi (2.68 km^{2})
  - Land: 0.36 sq mi (0.93 km^{2})
  - Water: 0.68 sq mi (1.75 km^{2})
- Elevation: 942 ft (287 m)

Population (2020)
  - Total: 726
  - Density: 2,023.2/sq mi (781.15/km^{2})
- Time zone: UTC-6 (Central (CST))
  - Summer (DST): UTC-5 (CDT)
- ZIP code: 55331
- Area code: 952
- FIPS code: 27-25918
- GNIS feature ID: 0644453
- Website: https://greenwoodmn.gov/

Greenwood is a community on Saint Albans Bay on Lake Minnetonka in Hennepin County, Minnesota, United States just northeast of the community of Excelsior, Minnesota. The population was 726 at the 2020 census.

== Geography ==
According to the United States Census Bureau, the city has a total area of 0.61 square miles (1.58 km^{2}), of which 0.36 square miles (0.93 km^{2}) is land and 0.25 square miles (0.65 km^{2}) is water. Minnesota State Highway 7 serves as a main route.

== History ==
Originally part of Excelsior Township, Greenwood was incorporated as an independent city in 1956.

== Demographics ==
Historical population
Census	Pop.	Note	%±
1960	520		—
1970	587		12.9%
1980	653		11.2%
1990	614		−6.0%
2000	729		18.7%
2010	688		−5.6%
2020	726		5.5%
U.S. Decennial Census

=== 2010 census ===
As of the census of 2010, there were 688 people, 290 households, and 223 families living in the city. The population density was 1,911.1 inhabitants per square mile (737.9/km^{2}). There were 327 housing units at an average density of 908.3 per square mile (350.7/km^{2}). The racial makeup of the city was 95.3% White, 0.6% African American, 0.3% Native American, 1.9% Asian, 0.1% from other races, and 1.7% from two or more races. Hispanic or Latino of any race were 2.0% of the population.

There were 290 households, of which 27.9% had children under the age of 18 living with them, 70.0% were married couples living together, 3.4% had a female householder with no husband present, 3.4% had a male householder with no wife present, and 23.1% were non-families. 19.0% of all households were made up of individuals, and 5.9% had someone living alone who was 65 years of age or older. The average household size was 2.37 and the average family size was 2.70.

The median age in the city was 49.8 years. 19.3% of residents were under the age of 18; 4.3% were between the ages of 18 and 24; 17.1% were from 25 to 44; 45.2% were from 45 to 64; and 14% were 65 years of age or older. The gender makeup of the city was 51.9% male and 48.1% female.

=== 2000 census ===
As of the census of 2000, there were 729 people, 285 households, and 214 families living in the city. The population density was 2,098.2 inhabitants per square mile (810.1/km^{2}). There were 297 housing units at an average density of 854.8 per square mile (330.0/km^{2}). The racial makeup of the city was 96.57% White, 0.69% African American, 0.55% Asian, 1.23% from other races, and 0.96% from two or more races. Hispanic or Latino of any race were 2.47% of the population.

There were 285 households, out of which 34.0% had children under the age of 18 living with them, 68.8% were married couples living together, 4.2% had a female householder with no husband present, and 24.6% were non-families. 18.9% of all households were made up of individuals, and 6.0% had someone living alone who was 65 years of age or older. The average household size was 2.56 and the average family size was 2.96.

In the city, the population was spread out, with 25.9% under the age of 18, 2.9% from 18 to 24, 26.7% from 25 to 44, 34.8% from 45 to 64, and 9.6% who were 65 years of age or older. The median age was 42 years. For every 100 females, there were 107.1 males. For every 100 females age 18 and over, there were 103.8 males.

The median income for a household in the city was $102,719, and the median income for a family was $127,013. Males had a median income of $69,375 versus $41,786 for females. The per capita income for the city was $63,200. About 0.4% of families and 0.8% of the population were below the poverty line, including 1.3% of those under age 18 and none of those age 65 or over.

== Politics ==
Presidential election results

Precinct General Election Results
Year	Republican	Democratic	Third parties
2024	46.8% 263	51.4% 289	1.8% 10
2020	47.2% 270	51.6% 295	1.2% 7
2016	45.0% 239	47.3% 251	7.7% 41
2012	57.7% 321	40.7% 226	1.6% 9
2008	55.0% 305	44.1% 245	0.9% 5
2004	62.0% 331	37.1% 198	0.9% 5
2000	60.5% 305	34.9% 176	4.6% 23
1996	56.5% 262	33.8% 157	9.7% 45
1992	51.8% 241	27.3% 127	20.9% 97
1988	67.2% 272	32.8% 133	0.0% 0
1984	75.8% 323	24.2% 103	0.0% 0
1980	62.4% 247	24.0% 95	13.6% 54
1976	68.5% 267	28.5% 111	3.0% 12
1972	70.8% 254	27.9% 100	1.3% 5
1968	62.6% 207	32.6% 108	4.8% 16
1964	59.5% 197	40.5% 134	0.0% 0
1960	69.1% 201	30.6% 89	0.3% 1

== Economy ==
Greenwood was home to the Old Log Theatre.
