= Six Mile Creek (Minnesota) =

Location
- Country: United States
- State: Minnesota
- Region: Laketown; Victoria; St. Bonifacious; Minnetrista

Physical characteristics
- Source
  - location: Piersons Lake
  - coordinates: 44.8436566°N 93.7077917°W
- Mouth
  - location: Lake Minnetonka
  - coordinates: 44.9162785°N 93.7026838°W

Basin features
- River system: Mississippi River at Minneapolis
- GNIS: 652101

Six Mile Creek drains a large area south and west of Lake Minnetonka, in Hennepin and Carver Counties, Minnesota, United States. It ends on the western shore of Halstead's Bay, the westernmost bay of Lake Minnetonka. It runs through mostly agricultural land but this area is also seeing more residential development.

Piersons Lake forms the headwaters of the creek, which then flows in this order through, Marsh Lake, Wasserman Lake, Lake Auburn, Lunsten Lake, Parley Lake, Mud Lake and then reaches its destination, Lake Minnetonka.

It has a very low gradient which often results in backwater (stagnant) conditions. Wasserman and Parley Lakes have Department of Natural Resources public boat accesses. The origin of its name is unclear as it is about 11 miles (18 km) long. It is about six miles (9.7 km) from Parley Lake to Lake Minnetonka.

The Six Mile Creek watershed that generally surrounds the creek and drains into it, is about 17,000 acres (69 km^{2}) in size. Other lakes in the watershed whose outflow eventually ends up in Six Mile are: Carl Krey, Church, Crosby, Stieger, Stone, Sunny, Turbid, and Zumbra.
