= Old Log Theatre =

Theater in Excelsior, Minnesota, United States

Coordinates: 44°54′38.18″N 93°33′27.57″W

- Formation: 1940
- Dissolved: 2024
- Type: Theatre group
- Location: Excelsior, Minnesota

The Old Log Theatre was the oldest professional theater in the state of Minnesota. It was sometimes cited as the oldest continuously operating professional theater in the United States. It was located in Excelsior and was funded entirely by ticket sales and income from its restaurant.

On February 20, 2024, owners Greg and Marissa Frankenfield announced their retirement, and said that the theatre and its associated restaurant would be closing permanently, with its last production consisting of a tribute to Buddy Holly occurring on March 2, 2024.

== History ==
The Old Log Theatre first opened in 1940 in Greenwood, in a dirt-floored log building now used as a scenery shop. Throughout its existence the theater has focused mostly on screwball comedy, contemporary plays and British farces, though in its early years it operated as a summer stock company. The original building seated 270 people and during its summer season the theater presented a show a week.

== Venue ==
During the 1950s the theater's popularity grew and late in that decade it found a need for larger quarters. Herb Bloomberg, a builder in Chanhassen, was hired to design and build the new theater on 10 acres (40,000 m^{2}) adjacent to the original theater in 1965. The new building could seat 655 and was designed to look like a barn with a large lobby featuring a fireplace and a high ceiling. Herb Bloomberg went on to build and operate the Chanhassen Dinner Theatres.

== Ownership ==
For 73 years the theater was owned by Don Stolz, who joined a year after its inception, when he was 23 and a graduate student in theater at Northwestern University. Hired to direct, he also performed in The Taming of the Shrew starting on his second day. The first show he directed that year was Sidney Howard's Ned McCobb's Daughter; he bought the theater in 1946 and continued to produce/direct the majority of shows and oversaw 600 productions. Stolz was instrumental in the growth of television in the Twin Cities and became a radio veteran in the area. In 2006, several of Stolz's sons took over theater operations, though Stolz remained active in the productions, including a short speech before and after each night's performance. He died on February 14, 2015, at age 97.

Greg and Marissa Frankenfield purchased the theater and restaurant in May 2013. Greg Frankenfield is cofounder and CEO of Magenic Technologies, a Minnesota information technology firm. The Frankenfields are theater enthusiasts and producers who have been on the boards of several local theatre organizations and invested in West End and Broadway productions.

The current theater was reconfigured to seat 560; a remodeling in summer 2014 included a deeper stage and new sound and lighting systems. They renovated the restaurant, which seats 250, and reopened it as Cast & Cru in fall 2014.

== Audience ==
An estimated 6 million people have attended productions at the Old Log Theatre.

== Alumni ==
Theater alumni include actor Charles Nolte, who spent three years with the theater, Loni Anderson, actor Nick Nolte, Julia Duffy, Steve Zahn, Tim Sharp and long-time Twin Cities news anchor and actor Dave Moore.
