= Lake Minnetonka =

Collection of lakes, bays and areas in Minnesota, US

- Mní iá Tháŋka (Dakota)
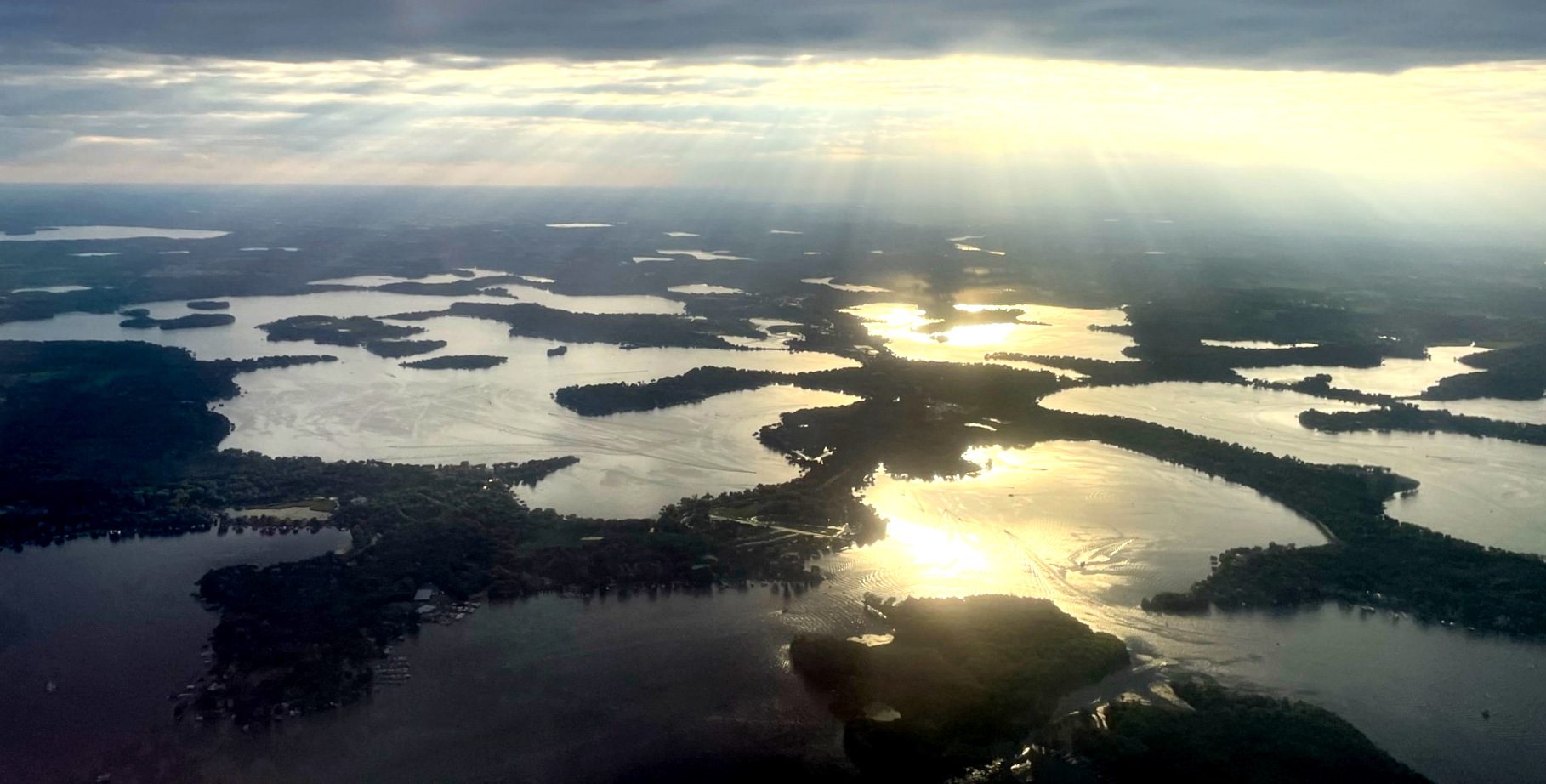
- Interactive map of Lake Minnetonka
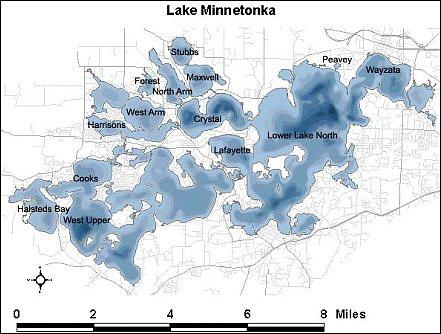
- Map
- Location: Hennepin and Carver counties, Minnesota, United States
- Coordinates: 44°56′00″N 93°34′00″W
- Primary inflows: Six Mile Creek
- Primary outflows: Minnehaha Creek
- Basin countries: United States
- Surface area: 14,528 acres (5,879 hectares)
- Max. depth: 113 ft (34 m)
- Shore length^{1}: 125 mi (200 km)
- Surface elevation: 929 ft (283 m)
- Islands: Big Island; Crane Island
- Settlements: Deephaven; Excelsior; Greenwood; Minnetonka; Minnetonka Beach; Minnetrista; Mound; Orono; Shorewood; Spring Park; Tonka Bay; Victoria; Wayzata; Woodland
- ^{1} Shore length is not a well-defined measure.

Lake Minnetonka (Dakota: Mní iá Tháŋka) is a lake located about 16 miles (26 km) west-southwest of Minneapolis, Minnesota. Lake Minnetonka has about 23 named bays and areas. The lake lies within Hennepin and Carver counties and is surrounded by 14 incorporated municipalities. At 14,528 acres (5,879 ha), it is Minnesota's ninth largest lake.

Lake Minnetonka was formed around 10,000 years ago during the retreat of the Laurentide ice sheet. The lake consists of interconnected kettle lakes, channels, and marshlands, along with 18 islands, giving it an irregular shape and 125 miles (201 km) of shoreline. Human habitation in the area dates back approximately 10,000 years, beginning with ancestral Indigenous peoples. Between 3500 BCE and 1500 CE, the Mound Builders era flourished; in the 1880s, 524 burial mounds and earthworks along the lakeshore were mapped and estimated to date from 300 BCE to 100 CE. By the 1700s, the Dakota people inhabited the area, utilizing the lake for hunting, fishing, harvesting wild rice, and setting up maple sugar camps. The lake holds cultural and spiritual significance for the Dakota people, with sacred sites such as Spirit Knob playing an important role in their traditions and beliefs. Following the Dakota War of 1862, the Dakota people were forcibly removed from the region.

European American settlement began in the 1850s, and with the advent of streetcars, trains, and steamboats, Lake Minnetonka became a nationally recognized vacation destination. Attractions like Big Island Park (1906) and the Excelsior Amusement Park (1925) contributed to its popularity. However, as resort areas developed in other parts of the country, Lake Minnetonka's national prominence as a vacation hotspot declined. It is a popular spot for local boaters, sailors, and fishermen.

== History ==
=== Early history ===
The first people who inhabited the Lake Minnetonka area were Indigenous peoples who migrated to the region at the end of the last ice age circa 8000 BCE. Later peoples who inhabited the area between 3500 BCE and 1500 CE are commonly referred to collectively as the "Mound Builders" because they constructed large land features serving spiritual, ceremonial, burial, and elite residential functions. The Mound Builder culture reached its apex circa 1150 CE and ceased to exist circa 1500 CE. In the 1880s, 524 burial mounds were mapped around the lakeshore, estimated to have been made between 300 B.C. and 100 A.D.

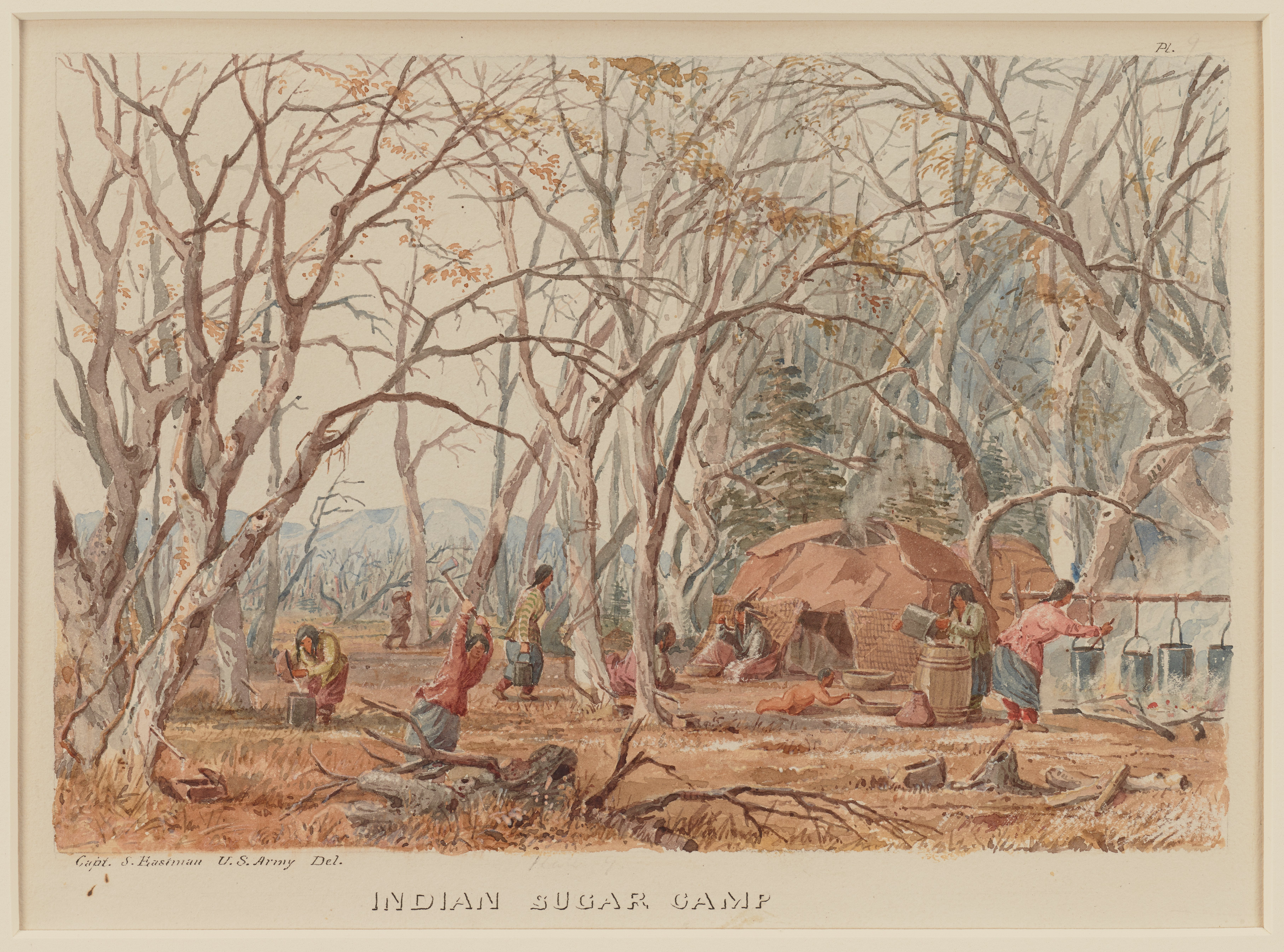
A watercolor painting by Seth Eastman of a sugar camp, most likely Dakota near Fort Snelling

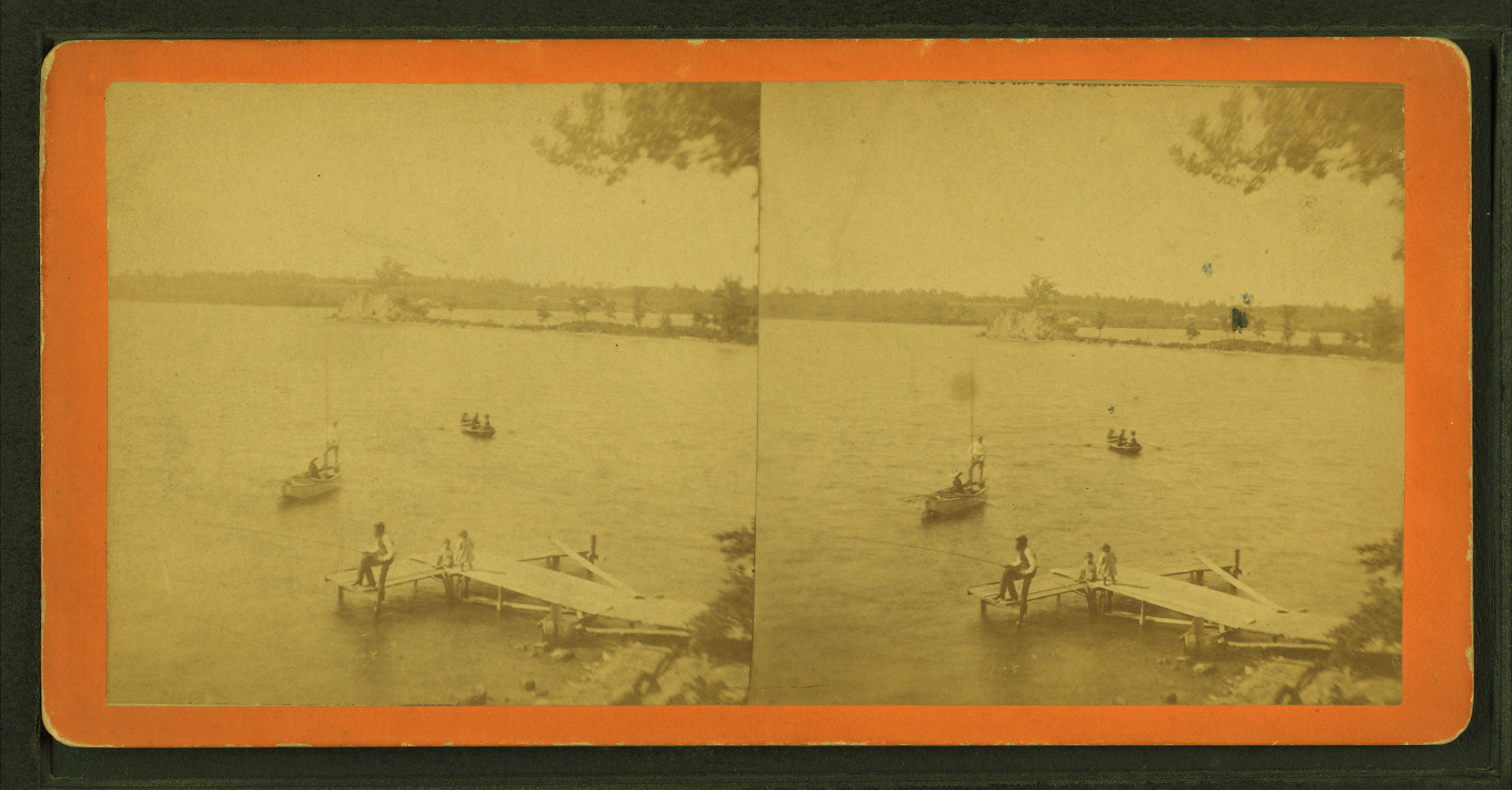
Stereoscope of recreational activity near Spirit Knob circa 1875

By the 1700s, Lake Minnetonka was inhabited by the Mdewakanton people, a subtribe of the Dakota Nation. The Dakota traditionally moved their villages seasonally: wild rice harvesting in the autumn, hunting camps in the winter, and maple sugar camps in the spring. The Mdewakanton, based in the Minnesota and Mississippi River valleys, used Lake Minnetonka as part of this annual cycle to hunt, fish, and gather resources like wild rice and maple sap. Big Island served as a key maple sugar camp, while Spirit Knob, a peninsula near present-day Wayzata, holds spiritual significance for the Dakota as an offering site. An important fur-trade Dakota trail extended from Spirit Knob around the lake to the village of Chief Shakopee I near present-day Shakopee, Minnesota, following a route that corresponds to present-day Minnesota State Highway 101, also known as Bushaway Road. During the Treaty of Mendota negotiations, the brother of Chief Shakopee II asserted that Lake Minnetonka should be included within their Dakota reservation boundaries. However, following the Dakota War of 1862, the Dakota were forcibly removed from the region (the conflicts of the war did not reach Lake Minnetonka).

Despite interactions with European Americans at Fort Snelling, the Dakota kept the lake secret from them due to its cultural significance. The first white Americans known to have visited Lake Minnetonka were two teenage boys, Joe Brown and Will Snelling, who canoed up Minnehaha Creek from Fort Saint Anthony in 1822. However, few other Euro-Americans visited the lake or even knew of its existence for three subsequent decades.

Lake Minnetonka was officially named by Minnesota's territorial governor, Alexander Ramsey, in 1852. He had been informed that the Dakota used the phrase Mní iá Tháŋka (“the-water-they-speak-of-is-large” in the Dakota language) to refer to the lake. Excelsior, the lake's first white settlement, was established the following year. The first steamboat on Lake Minnetonka, a small side-wheel steamer named Governor Ramsey, was launched in 1861. Travel to Lake Minnetonka remained relatively difficult, however, until the Saint Paul and Pacific Railroad extended a line to Wayzata in 1867.

Peter Gideon, an early Minnesota horticulturist, moved to the Lake Minnetonka area in 1853. In 1868 he successfully bred a species of apple that could withstand Minnesota's harsh winters and named it the "Wealthy" in honor of his wife. This breakthrough made possible the later developments of the Haralson and Honeycrisp apples in 1913 and 1974, respectively.

=== Resort years ===
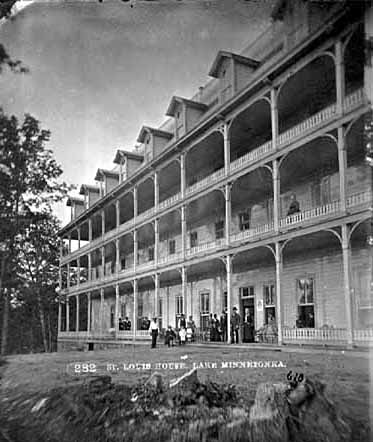
Hotel Saint Louis in Deephaven

The construction of hotels and boarding houses near Lake Minnetonka boomed during the 1870s and early 1880s. The first large hotel on the lake, the Hotel Saint Louis in Deephaven, was built in 1879 and boasted 150 guest rooms with private verandas. The larger Lake Park Hotel was completed in Tonka Bay later that year. The largest hotel ever built on Lake Minnetonka, the Hotel Lafayette in Minnetonka Beach, opened in 1882. At nearly 800 feet (244 m) long and five stories tall, the Hotel Lafayette could accommodate over 1,000 guests. Many guests hailed from the Deep South and spent entire summers on the lake to enjoy its scenery and cooler climate.

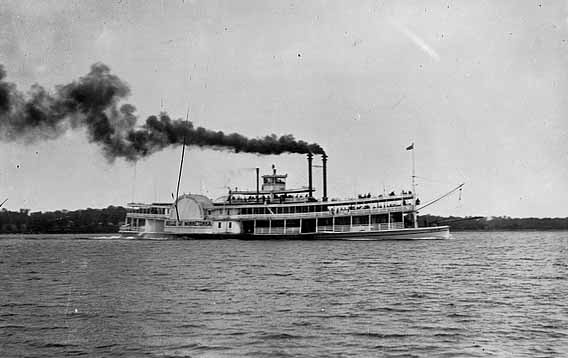
Belle of Minnetonka circa 1883

Large steamboats also proliferated on Lake Minnetonka during this time. The first inland steamboat ever to be equipped with electric lights, City of Saint Louis, was assembled in Wayzata in 1881 and began servicing lakeside communities and resorts later that year. The largest vessel ever to operate on Lake Minnetonka, Belle of Minnetonka, was launched and put into service in 1882. At 300 feet (91 m) long, Belle of Minnetonka could purportedly accommodate up to 2,500 passengersat

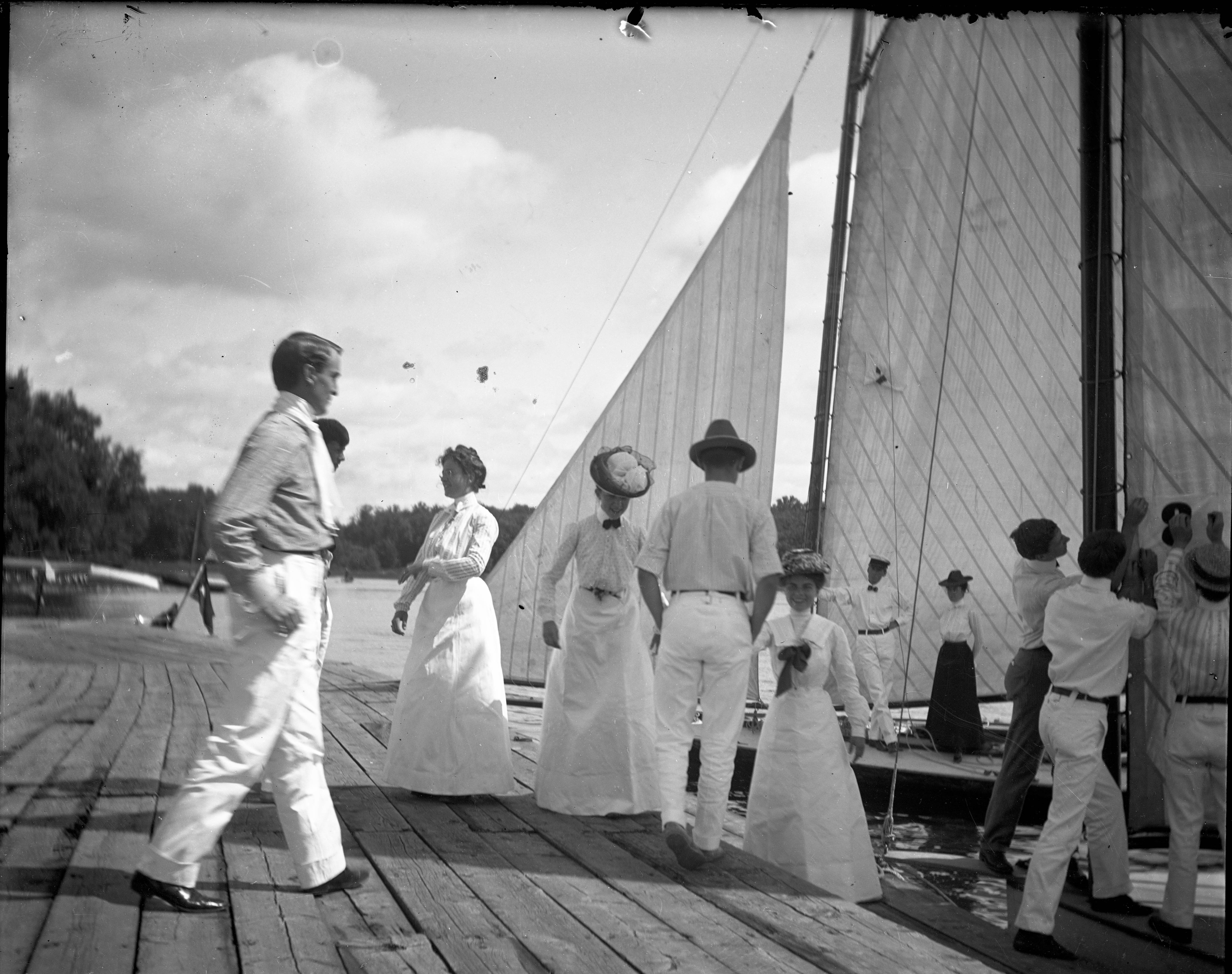
Passengers disembarking at the Minnetonka Yacht Club, ca. 1900

The lake's first yacht club, the Minnetonka Yacht Club, was founded in 1882 in Deephaven. Hazen Burton, one of the club's original co-founders, is credited for commissioning the development of the racing scow. When he debuted the first racing scow, Onawa, in 1893, it was disqualified for winning nearly every regatta it entered. The rules were eventually modified, however, and racing scows became popular within the sailing community worldwide. Onawa is currently displayed at the Excelsior-Lake Minnetonka Historical Society Museum in Excelsior.

Many of Lake Minnetonka's visitors began finding new places to vacation as the railroads expanded westward in the 1890s, causing most of the lake's hotels and steamboats to suffer financially and cease operations. Some hotels burned during this time, but most were demolished or dismantled. By 1900, however, an increasing number of families had begun to construct private summer cottages around Lake Minnetonka. Permanent homes and grand country estates also began to appear around the lake as the Twin Cities metropolitan area grew. Some of these homes and cottages still exist, including the Thompson Summer House in Minnetonka Beach.

=== Golden years ===
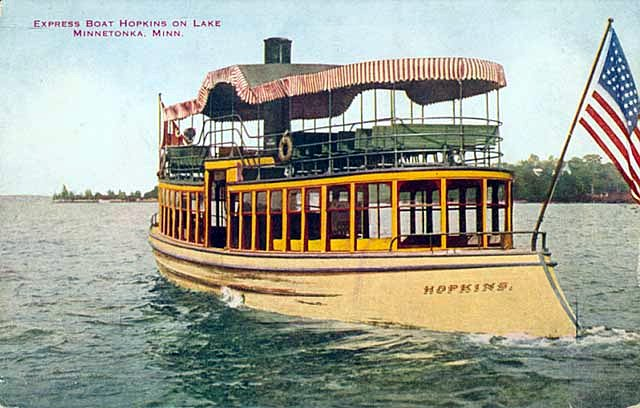
Express Boat Hopkins circa 1912

In 1905 the Twin City Rapid Transit Company (TCRT) extended a streetcar line to the village of Excelsior on Lake Minnetonka's southern shore. The lake saw dramatic change in 1906 as TCRT also opened Big Island Park on Big Island and debuted its Express Boat service. The Express Boats, casually referred to as “streetcar boats,” were essentially floating streetcars that served the lake's summer residents. Six (and later seven) of these steamboats connected 26 landings around the lake to Excelsior, where passengers could transfer onto streetcars bound for the Twin Cities. Many streetcar boat passengers were lakeside residents commuting to their jobs in Minneapolis and Saint Paul. Tourists, on the other hand, could board one of three large ferry boats bound for Big Island Park, where they could picnic, enjoy live music, and ride several attractions. However, TCRT closed Big Island Park in 1911 due to its excessive operating and maintenance costs.

Ridership on the streetcar boats began to plummet when roads were improved in the area in the early 1920s. Steamboat service on Lake Minnetonka grew evermore limited during this time, and by 1926 TCRT had suspended all steamboat service on the lake. To rid itself of the vessels, TCRT scuttled three of the seven streetcar boats in deep water north of Big Island that summer. Three of the other boats were scrapped shortly thereafter, and one was sold and used as an excursion boat until it, too, was scuttled in 1949. Streetcar service to Excelsior continued until 1932.

Crane Island, an island near the western shore of the lake, was organized as a summer cottage retreat in 1907. The Crane Island Association platted a number of lots around the perimeter of the island and dedicated a commons area at its center. Many of the island's original cottages remain, and today it is a historic district listed on the National Register of Historic Places.

Several of the area's most prestigious country clubs, including the Lafayette Club, Minnetonka Country Club, and Woodhill Country Club, were also founded during this period.

=== Late 20th century ===
Fred W. Pearce, a well-known amusement park operator, opened Excelsior Amusement Park in Excelsior in 1925. Attractions included a fun house, the Silver Streak, the Scrambler, a carousel, picnic accommodations, and a roller coaster called the Cyclone. The Rolling Stones performed live at the park's Danceland pavilion in 1964 for a crowd of approximately 300. Excelsior Amusement Park continued to be a tourist destination until it closed in 1973. Today the site is occupied by a condominium complex and Maynards Restaurant.

In 1926 architect Frank Lloyd Wright and his mistress Olga Hinzengberg were arrested for allegedly violating the Mann Act while vacationing at a cottage in Tonka Bay. The charges were soon dropped after allegations against them were found untrue.

Before gaining national fame in the early 1940s, LaVerne, Maxene, and Patty Andrews of The Andrews Sisters spent their summers with relatives in Mound, a town in an area known as Westonka. The trio often returned to the area later in life as well.

In 1946 Mound Metalcraft was established in Mound. The company changed its name to Tonka Toys in the 1950s, when it became known for manufacturing toy trucks. Tonka Toys was purchased by Hasbro in 1991 and is no longer based in Minnesota.

Two F4 tornadoes ravaged the Lake Minnetonka area during the tornado outbreak of 1965, causing much damage in the communities of Mound, Navarre, and Deephaven. Hundreds of homes and many local businesses were destroyed during the outbreak.

The steamboat Minnehaha, one of the streetcar boats scuttled in 1926, was raised from the bottom of Lake Minnetonka in 1980, restored, and returned to service by 1996. Now operated by the Museum of Lake Minnetonka, Minnehaha once again carries passengers between the communities of Excelsior and Wayzata as she did over a century ago.

=== National Historic Districts and Places ===
The Lake Minnetonka area is home to two National Historic Districts: the Crane Island Historic District and The Water Street Historic District in the community of Excelsior. It is also home to 6 National Register of Historic Places sites.

== Natural history and limnology ==
=== Geography ===
Lake Minnetonka was formed approximately 10,000 years ago as the Laurentide Ice Sheet receded northward. The lake is a collection of kettle lakes connected by channels and marshlands which, along with 18 islands, form its irregular shape and 125 miles (201 km) of shoreline. Lake Minnetonka is divided into two halves, the Upper Lake in the west and the Lower Lake in the east, which reflect the easterly flow of water in the lake's watershed. The deepest point of Lake Minnetonka is 113 feet (34 m) in Crystal Bay. The average depth of the lake is approximately 30 feet (9 m). With a surface area of 14,528 acres (5,879 ha), Lake Minnetonka is the ninth largest lake in Minnesota.

==== Lake Minnetonka bays and lakes ====
1. Black Lake
2. Brown's Bay
3. Carman's/Old Channel Bay
4. Carson's Bay
5. Cook's Bay
6. Crystal Bay
7. East Upper Lake
8. Emerald Lake
9. Excelsior Bay
10. Forest Lake
11. Gideon's Bay
12. Gray's Bay
13. Halsted's Bay
14. Harrison's Bay
15. Jenning's Bay
16. Lafayette Bay
17. Libb's Lake
18. Maxwell Bay
19. North Arm Bay
20. North Lower Lake
21. Peavy Lake
22. Phelp's Bay
23. Priest's Bay
24. Robinson's Bay
25. St. Alban's Bay
26. St. Louis Bay
27. Seton Lake
28. Smith's Bay
29. Smithtown Bay
30. South Lower Lake & Echo Bay
31. South Upper Lake
32. Spring Park Bay
33. Stubb's Bay
34. Tanager Lake
35. Wayzata Bay
36. West Arm Bay
37. West Upper Lake

===== Halsted's Bay =====
Halsted's Bay (sometimes spelled Halstead's) is named for the settler Frank W. Halsted, who migrated to its shores in 1855. Its main tributary is Six Mile Creek that enters the bay from the west. Access to the bay is provided by a public boat launch along Halstead's Drive.

The bay is one of the last on Lake Minnetonka to see intensive modern residential development. It has the distinction of being downstream from the city of Saint Bonifacius, which did not adequately treat its sewage until the early 1980s, when it connected to the metropolitan area sewage system. Its northern and eastern shores in places have steep terrain leading down to the bay. Two examples are the Bluffs neighborhood on the north, and the Eagles Bluff area.

=== Hydrology ===
Several streams flow into Lake Minnetonka, the largest of which is Six Mile Creek. The only outlet from the lake is Minnehaha Creek. At the headwaters of Minnehaha Creek near the lake's eastern end, the Grays Bay Dam helps maintain an average water level of 929 feet (283 m) above sea level. The flow over the dam ranges from zero to 300 cubic feet (8.5 m^{3}) per second, or a daily rate of up to 193,881,600 US gallons (733,922 m^{3}). Evaporation from Lake Minnetonka can reach as high as 50 million US gallons (190,000 m^{3}) per day. Annual evaporation from the lake is about 30 inches (76 cm), or 11.5 billion US gallons (44,000,000 m^{3}). This is countered by an average rainfall rate of 28 inches (71 cm) per year and an average surface runoff rate of 20 inches (51 cm) per year. There have been a number of droughts throughout Lake Minnetonka's history, notably during the 1930s and late 1980s. Water levels reached a record low of 921.78 feet (281 m) above sea level in 1937 and a record high of 931.11 feet (284 m) above sea level in 2014.

Lake Minnetonka typically freezes over with 12 to 18 inches (30 to 46 centimetres) of ice during the winter months. The median "ice-out" date, which has been recorded on Lake Minnetonka since 1855, is April 14. The earliest recorded ice-out date was March 11, 1878, and the latest recorded ice-out date was May 8, 1856. Water surface temperatures typically peak at around 80°F (26.7°C) in early August.

=== Freshwater biology ===
Lake Minnetonka contains black bullhead, black crappie, bluegill, bowfin, common carp, green sunfish, hybrid sunfish, largemouth bass, muskellunge, northern pike, pumpkinseed, rock bass, smallmouth bass, walleye, white sucker, yellow bullhead, and yellow perch. Some fish consumption guidelines have been placed on the lake's bluegill, common carp, largemouth bass, northern pike, and walleye.

According to local legend, a sturgeon in excess of 10 feet (3 m) in length has lurked beneath the surface of Lake Minnetonka for many years. Sightings of the sturgeon, which is often referred to as "Lou," have been persistent since the 1980s. In 2019 a large sturgeon was caught by two boys on Minnehaha Creek. The Minnesota DNR speculated that it could have originated from Lake Minnetonka.

=== Environmental issues ===
Lake Minnetonka's environmental issues became a concern after curly-leaf pondweed was discovered in its waters in 1900. Purple loosestrife was discovered in the lake in 1940, as was Eurasian water milfoil in 1987. Zebra mussels were discovered in the lake in 2010.

Lake Minnetonka suffered from significant sewage, fertilizer, and surface runoff pollution until the 1970s. Conditions have since improved, but pollution from fertilizer and surface runoff remains an ongoing issue. Water quality is now closely monitored.

It is not uncommon for some Lake Minnetonka beaches to be temporarily closed due to elevated levels of E. coli contamination. An outbreak of an unidentified waterborne pathogen sickened at least 116 swimmers at Cruiser's Cove, a popular party spot near Big Island, in 2019.

Lake Minnetonka's environment is currently overseen by three separate agencies. These include the Minnehaha Creek Watershed District, the Lake Minnetonka Conservation District, and the Minnesota Department of Natural Resources.

== Attractions and activities ==
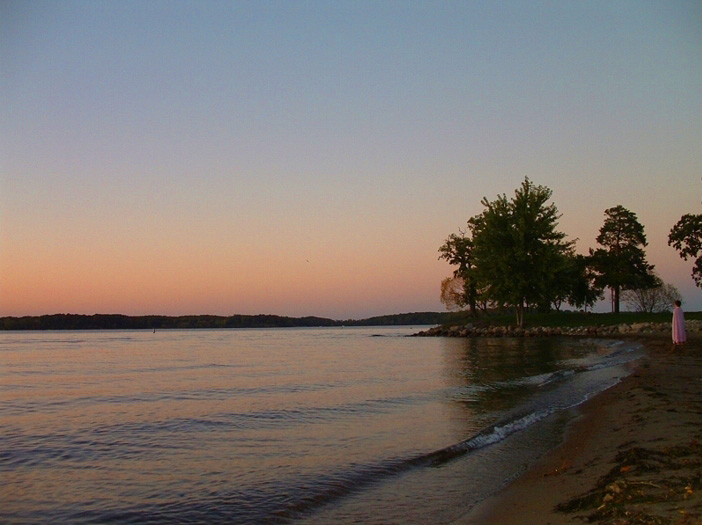
Excelsior Beach

Some of the most visited attractions on Lake Minnetonka are restaurants. Al & Alma's Supper Club and Charter Cruises was founded in Mound in 1956 and is Lake Minnetonka's oldest continually-operated restaurant and cruise line. Lord Fletcher's restaurant in Spring Park has been one of Lake Minnetonka's most popular establishments since opening in 1968. Maynards Restaurant, established in Excelsior in 1998, is another popular waterfront restaurant. Downtown Excelsior and Wayzata have since become Twin Cities culinary destinations as many new restaurants continue to appear there.

The Old Log Theater, located in Greenwood, first opened in 1940 and is now Minnesota's oldest professional theater organization. Alumni of the theater include actors Nick Nolte and Loni Anderson.

Lake Minnetonka is home to several regional parks owned by Three Rivers Park District. The largest among these are Lake Minnetonka Regional Park in Minnetrista and Noerenberg Gardens in Orono. Three Rivers Park District also maintains two regional bike trails near the lake. Two other large public parks on Lake Minnetonka include Big Island Nature Park and the Excelsior Commons.

Boating, sailing, and fishing are the most common activities on Lake Minnetonka. Boats of all sizes and horsepower may be legally launched on Lake Minnetonka, but speed and noise restrictions do apply. The lake has four active yacht clubs and an antique and classic boat society known as the Bob Speltz Land O' Lakes Chapter of the ACBS. Several cruise companies operate larger excursion vessels on the lake, the largest of which is Al & Alma's 83 foot (25 m) Bella Vista. Lake Minnetonka's magnificent homes are a common highlight on these sightseeing, dinner, and brunch cruises.

Other activities on Lake Minnetonka include swimming, kayaking, and standup paddleboarding during the summer, and ice fishing, snowmobiling, and ice yachting during the winter.

Several community festivals are held around the lake each year. Some of the larger events include James J. Hill Days in Wayzata, Apple Day in Excelsior, and the Spirit of the Lakes Festival in Mound.

== In popular culture ==
Perhaps the best known association is that with local music icon Prince. His third album, Dirty Mind, was recorded at a home on Lake Minnetonka's North Arm in 1980. Prince rented and lived at the home between 1979 and early 1981. He ultimately settled in Chanhassen, approximately two miles south of Lake Minnetonka, in 1987. Lake Minnetonka is famously mentioned in the 1984 film Purple Rain during a scene in which The Kid (Prince) tells his love interest (Apollonia Kotero) to "purify [herself] in the waters of Lake Minnetonka." After she enters the water, Prince reveals that the water she has entered is not actually Lake Minnetonka. Dave Chappelle parodied the scene in a 2004 episode of Chappelle's Show when he asked (as Prince), "Why don't you purify yourself in the waters of Lake Minnetonka?" while winning a basketball game.

Several scenes from the 1972 films The Heartbreak Kid and Slaughterhouse-Five were filmed at Lake Minnetonka. In an episode of the television series Beverly Hills 90210, Dylan (Luke Perry) tells Brenda (Shannen Doherty) that his privileged background enabled him to spend summers in Paris as a child. Brenda reacts by saying "You mean you went to Paris every summer? We went to Lake Minnetonka!" Lake Minnetonka was briefly featured in the reality television series Keeping Up with the Kardashians in 2011. Several scenes from the 2017 film Wilson were filmed at Lake Minnetonka. Shots of Lake Minnetonka were included in the lyric video for the 2015 song "Cool for the Summer" by Demi Lovato.

Thurlow Lieurance's song "By the Waters of Minnetonka" was published by the Theodore Presser Company in 1913 and has since been recorded by artists such as Glenn Miller and Desi Arnaz. Singer-songwriter Bonnie Raitt's self-titled debut album was recorded at an abandoned summer camp on Lake Minnetonka's Enchanted Island in 1971.

Lake Minnetonka received some unwanted national attention in October 2005 following an incident known as the Minnesota Vikings boat party scandal. In insurance, lake side properties of Lake Minnetonka's shore side is considered to be the front door, rather than the road side, called the Waterfront (area).

== See also ==
- List of lakes of Minnesota
- Excelsior, Minnesota
- Minnehaha (steamboat)
- Minnehaha Creek Watershed District
- Wayzata, Minnesota
- Wayzata Bay Wreck
- Westonka
