= Area code 952 =

Area code for southwest suburbs of Minneapolis-Saint Paul, Minnesota

Coordinates: 44°45′N 93°36′W

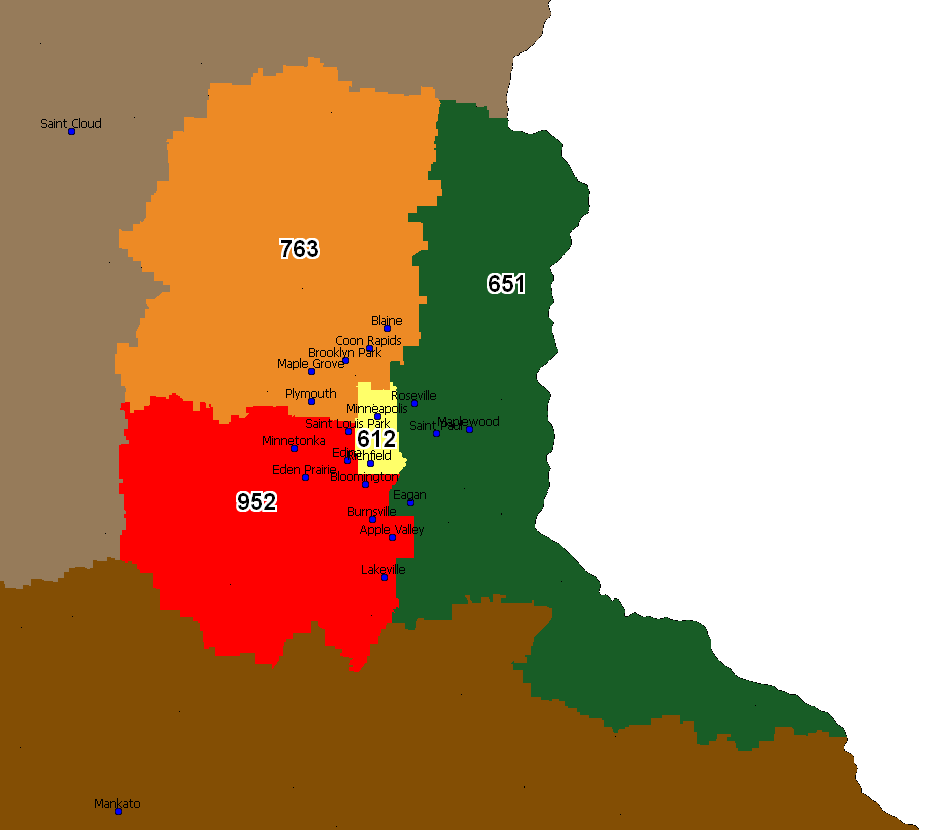
Metropolitan area codes with 952 in red.

A map of Minnesota area codes.

Area code 952 is the telephone area code in the North American Numbering Plan (NANP) for the southwestern suburbs of Minneapolis-St. Paul in the U.S. state of Minnesota. The numbering plan area (NPA) includes cities such as Bloomington, Eden Prairie, Edina and Minnetonka. It was created in 2000 along with area code 763 (northwest suburbs) when they were carved out of area code 612, which now only contains Minneapolis and a few inner-ring locales.

The area code splits in the Twin Cities are unusual because they split along municipal lines, rather than central office boundaries. This led to numerous exchanges being divided between two area codes. One central office, the Penn Avenue office in Minneapolis, had its geographical territory divided into area code 612 for portions in Minneapolis; 763 for portions in Golden Valley; and 952 for portions in St. Louis Park. Competitive local exchange carriers serving large portions of the metro area also ended up serving three area codes with the same prefixes.

952 is bordered on the north and northeast by 763 and 612 respectively, on the east by area code 651, and by area code 507 to the south. This area is in the Central Time Zone.

Despite the Twin Cities' rapid growth, 952 is nowhere near exhaustion. The April 2026 NANPA projections predict an exhaust date of 2374.

Even with the split into four area codes, most of the Twin Cities region is still a single rate center. The four Twin Cities area codes comprise one of the largest local calling areas in the United States; with a few exceptions, no long-distance charges are applied from one part of the Twin Cities to another. Portions of area codes 320 and 507 are local calls from the Twin Cities as well.

Prior to October 2021, area code 952 had telephone numbers assigned for the central office code 988. In 2020, 988 was designated nationwide as a dialing code for the National Suicide Prevention Lifeline, which created a conflict for exchanges that permit seven-digit dialing. This area code was therefore scheduled to transition to ten-digit dialing by October 24, 2021.

== Service area ==
- Apple Valley
- Belle Plaine
- Bloomington
- Burnsville
- Carver
- Chanhassen
- Chaska
- Cologne
- Eden Prairie
- Edina
- Elko New Market
- Excelsior
- Hopkins
- Jordan
- Lakeville
- Long Lake
- Merriam
- Minnetonka
- Minnetrista
- Mound
- New Prague
- Norwood Young America
- Orono
- Prior Lake
- St. Bonifacius
- St. Louis Park
- Savage
- Shakopee
- Shorewood
- Spring Park
- Tonka Bay
- Victoria
- Waconia
- Watertown
- Wayzata

== See also ==
- List of Minnesota area codes
- List of North American Numbering Plan area codes

Minnesota area codes: 218, 320, 507/924, 612, 651, 763, 952
| | North: 763 | |
| West: 320 | 952 | East: 612, 651 |
| | South: 507/924 | |
