= Tonka Bay, Minnesota =

City in Minnesota, United States

Coordinates: 44°54′31″N 93°35′35″W

- City
- City of Tonka Bay
- Logo

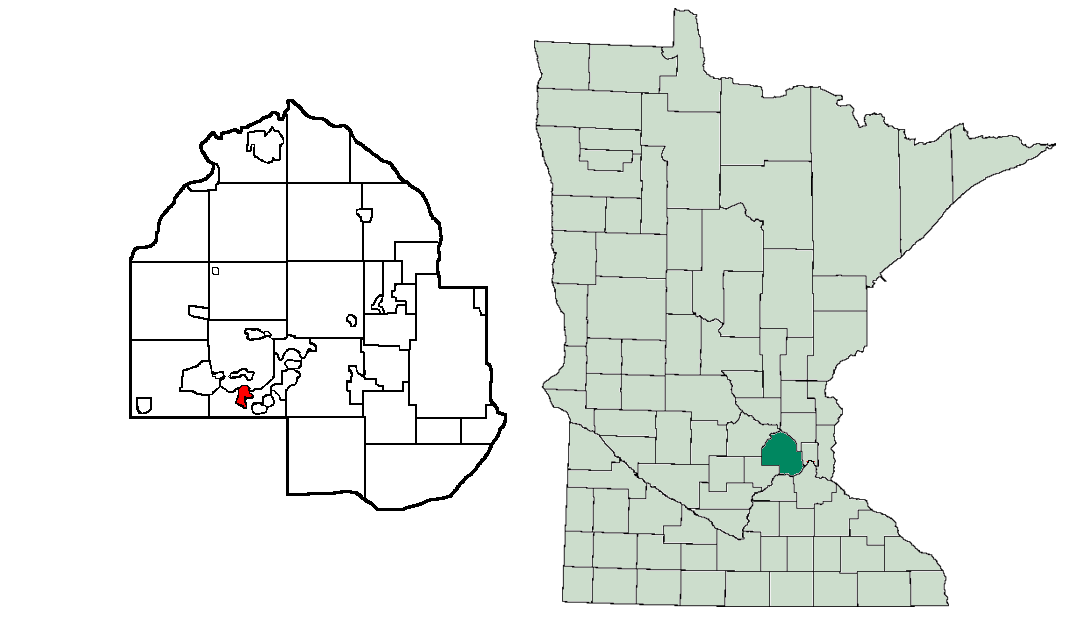
- Location of Tonka Bay within Hennepin County, Minnesota
- Country: United States
- State: Minnesota
- County: Hennepin
- Incorporated: 1901

Government
  - Mayor: Adam Jennings

Area
  - Total: 2.11 sq mi (5.47 km^{2})
  - Land: 0.94 sq mi (2.43 km^{2})
  - Water: 1.17 sq mi (3.03 km^{2})

Population (2020)
  - Total: 1,442
  - Density: 1,536.0/sq mi (593.05/km^{2})
- Time zone: UTC-6 (Central (CST))
  - Summer (DST): UTC-5 (CDT)
- ZIP code: 55331
- Area code: 952
- FIPS code: 27-65164
- GNIS feature ID: 2397036
- Website: www.cityoftonkabay.net

Tonka Bay is a city in Hennepin County, Minnesota, United States. It is on Lake Minnetonka between the upper and lower lakes. It gained some popularity in the 1880s and 1890s as a summer lake resort. The population was 1,442 at the 2020 census.

== Geography ==
According to the United States Census Bureau, the city has an area of 0.99 square miles (2.56 km^{2}), of which 0.93 square miles (2.41 km^{2}) is land and 0.06 square miles (0.16 km^{2}) is water. Manitou Road serves as a main route.

== History ==
Circa 10,000 B.C. – Tonka Bay forms during the recession of the last glaciation – the Wisconsin. Upper and Lower Lake Minnetonka and the peninsula and bays that now make up Tonka Bay forms as the ice sheet retreats.

1852 – Signing of Treaty of Traverse des Sioux that opens up the Lake Minnetonka area to white settlement.

1852 –Territorial Governor Alexander Ramsey explores Lake Minnetonka and officially names it “Minne” (Sioux for water) and “Tonka” (Sioux for big or strong).

1853 – Reverend Stephen Hull comes to the area. He creates the first narrows, “Hull’s Narrows,” located nearby present-day County Road 19 north of West Point Road. The Narrows allows boats to pass between Upper and Lower Lake Minnetonka.

1864 - Horticulturist Peter Gideon claimed 160 acres (0.65 km^{2}) in what would become Tonka Bay. Here he propagated the "Wealthy" apple, which can survive the harsh Minnesota winters, named for his wife Wealthy Hull.

1879 – The Lake Park Hotel is built as part of the Chautauqua movement.

1887 – Old Orchard House is built by John Finley Wilcox. He plants hundreds of acres of orchards that once stood alongside County Road 19.

1890 – Fred B. Snyder buys the 28-acre Clay Cliffe Estate for $56.

1901 – Tonka Bay incorporates in response to the need to provide services for its increasingly stable population. Wilcox becomes Tonka Bay’s first mayor.

1904 –Tonka Bay elementary school is built.

1908 – The Twin City Rapid Transit Company purchases the Lake Park Hotel and changes its name to the Tonka Bay Hotel. It closes in 1911.

1911 – The first bridge over the narrows is built in Tonka Bay.

1913 –Tonka Bay Marine is founded by the Westman Family.

1953 –Tonka Bay’s elementary school becomes Tonka Bay Village Hall.

1955 – Minnetonka Plaza constructed.

Late 1980s to mid 1990s– New developments are built on the grounds of great estates of the past, such as the Clay Cliffe Estate, Arbor Shores, and the W.O. Winston Estate, now known as the subdivision of Gideon’s Point.

2002 - Police/Fire Campus constructed.

2003 to 2004 – Plaza renamed Tonka Village Shopping Center, Liquor Store sold to County for demolition to make way for County Road 19 reconstruction.

2011 - 12 boat slips were added to the City Marina.

2016 - City Monument installed at southern town border.

2017 – City Monument at northern town border.

2021 - Carrick Luxury Apartments open. 86 Luxury apartment and townhome units in the city.

2023 - Lake Villa Townhomes built. Ongoing additional units being added.

2023 - $5 million Manitou Watermain project to update city water infrastructure.

2024 - $8.5 million street and infrastructure project spurred by additional water improvements. Project was supported by a $3 million federal HUD grant to the city.

2025 - New pickleball and tennis courts added at Wekota Park.

2026 - New $300,000 playground planned for Manitou Park.

Formerly part of Excelsior Township, Tonka Bay was incorporated as an independent village in 1901.

== Demographics ==
Historical population
Census	Pop.	Note	%±
1910	107		—
1920	84		−21.5%
1930	193		129.8%
1940	361		87.0%
1950	899		149.0%
1960	1,204		33.9%
1970	1,397		16.0%
1980	1,354		−3.1%
1990	1,472		8.7%
2000	1,547		5.1%
2010	1,475		−4.7%
2020	1,442		−2.2%
U.S. Decennial Census

=== 2010 census ===
As of the census of 2010, there were 1,475 people, 586 households, and 458 families living in the city. The population density was 1,586.0 inhabitants per square mile (612.4/km^{2}). There were 657 housing units at an average density of 706.5 per square mile (272.8/km^{2}). The racial makeup of the city was 97.6% White, 0.8% African American, 0.1% Native American, 0.7% Asian, 0.1% from other races, and 0.7% from two or more races. Hispanic or Latino of any race were 0.9% of the population.

There were 586 households, of which 31.6% had children under the age of 18 living with them, 68.6% were married couples living together, 4.8% had a female householder with no husband present, 4.8% had a male householder with no wife present, and 21.8% were non-families. 18.9% of all households were made up of individuals, and 6.1% had someone living alone who was 65 years of age or older. The average household size was 2.52 and the average family size was 2.87.

The median age in the city was 47.8 years. 23.6% of residents were under the age of 18; 5.2% were between the ages of 18 and 24; 15.2% were from 25 to 44; 41.8% were from 45 to 64; and 14.3% were 65 years of age or older. The gender makeup of the city was 51.4% male and 48.6% female.

=== 2000 census ===
As of the census of 2000, there were 1,547 people, 614 households, and 456 families living in the city. The population density was 1,622.0 inhabitants per square mile (626.3/km^{2}). There were 651 housing units at an average density of 682.5 per square mile (263.5/km^{2}). The racial makeup of the city was 98.64% White, 0.13% African American, 0.06% Native American, 0.39% Asian, 0.52% from other races, and 0.26% from two or more races. Hispanic or Latino of any race were 1.42% of the population.

There were 614 households, out of which 34.5% had children under the age of 18 living with them, 65.5% were married couples living together, 5.0% had a female householder with no husband present, and 25.7% were non-families. 20.2% of all households were made up of individuals, and 3.7% had someone living alone who was 65 years of age or older. The average household size was 2.52 and the average family size was 2.90.

In the city, the population was spread out, with 24.8% under the age of 18, 4.7% from 18 to 24, 27.8% from 25 to 44, 33.9% from 45 to 64, and 8.8% who were 65 years of age or older. The median age was 41 years. For every 100 females, there were 104.1 males. For every 100 females age 18 and over, there were 103.7 males.

The median income for a household in the city was $84,879, and the median income for a family was $90,783. Males had a median income of $69,375 versus $41,328 for females. The per capita income for the city was $50,825. About 1.9% of families and 2.2% of the population were below the poverty line, including 2.1% of those under age 18 and 1.5% of those age 65 or over.

== Politics ==
Presidential election results

2020 Precinct Results Spreadsheet2016 Precinct Results Spreadsheet2012 Precinct Results Spreadsheet2008 Precinct Results Spreadsheet2004 Precinct Results Spreadsheet2000 Precinct Results Spreadsheet
Year	Republican	Democratic	Third parties
2024	45.8% 525	50.9% 583	3.3% 38
2020	46.5% 530	51.6% 588	1.9% 22
2016	46.1% 478	45.1% 468	8.8% 92
2012	57.5% 608	40.4% 427	2.1% 23
2008	54.0% 552	44.8% 458	1.2% 12
2004	56.6% 597	42.2% 445	1.2% 12
2000	56.2% 578	36.7% 378	7.1% 73

== Sports ==
As of 2017, the latest champion of the USA Rink Bandy League is Tonka Bay Bombers.
