= Merriam, Minnesota =

Ghost town in Minnesota, United States

Merriam
- Extinct town
- Location within Minnesota
- Coordinates: 44°44′16″N 93°35′40″W
- Country: United States
- State: Minnesota
- County: Scott
- Time zone: UTC-6 (Central (EST))
  - Summer (DST): UTC-5 (EDT)

Merriam was a town in Scott County, in the U.S. state of Minnesota. The town has since been closed altogether.

== History ==
Merriam was platted in 1866. The community was named for John L. Merriam, a Minnesota legislator. A post office was established at Merriam in 1872, closed in 1873, reopened in 1879, and closed permanently in 1905.
