= Minnetonka Beach, Minnesota =

City in Minnesota, United States

Minnetonka Beach
- City
- City of the Village of Minnetonka Beach
- Minnetonka Beach Water Tower, a city landmark

- Logo

- Location of Minnetonka Beach within Hennepin County, Minnesota
- Coordinates: 44°56′22″N 93°35′30″W
- Country: United States
- State: Minnesota
- County: Hennepin
- Incorporated: 1894

Government
  - Mayor: Joe Pagano

Area
  - Total: 1.54 sq mi (3.98 km^{2})
  - Land: 0.47 sq mi (1.21 km^{2})
  - Water: 1.07 sq mi (2.77 km^{2})
- Elevation: 942 ft (287 m)

Population (2020)
  - Total: 546
  - Density: 1,168.3/sq mi (451.07/km^{2})
- Time zone: UTC-6 (Central (CST))
  - Summer (DST): UTC-5 (CDT)
- ZIP code: 55361
- Area code: 952
- FIPS code: 27-43270
- GNIS feature ID: 0647950
- Website: www.ci.minnetonka-beach.mn.us

Minnetonka Beach is a city in Hennepin County, Minnesota, United States. Located on Lake Minnetonka, the population was 546 at the 2020 census.

== History ==
Minnetonka Beach (Officially The Village of Minnetonka Beach) is located on the shores of Lake Minnetonka. Originally part of Excelsior Township, Minnetonka Beach was the site of the Hotel Lafayette, which was built by the Minneapolis, Saint Paul, & Manitoba Railway (later part of the Great Northern Railway) in 1882. In 1884, Minnetonka Beach was annexed by Medina Township. The community was incorporated as an independent village in 1894.

After the Hotel Lafayette burned in 1897, a portion of the property became home to the Lafayette Club. The original clubhouse of the Lafayette Club was built in 1900 and burned in 1922. The current clubhouse was constructed in 1924.

== Geography ==
According to the United States Census Bureau, the city has a total area of 0.48 square miles (1.24 km^{2}), of which 0.47 square miles (1.22 km^{2}) is land and 0.01 square miles (0.03 km^{2}) is water. County 15 serves as a main route.

== Demographics ==
Historical population
Census	Pop.	Note	%±
1900	101		—
1910	166		64.4%
1920	94		−43.4%
1930	112		19.1%
1940	229		104.5%
1950	376		64.2%
1960	544		44.7%
1970	586		7.7%
1980	575		−1.9%
1990	573		−0.3%
2000	614		7.2%
2010	539		−12.2%
2020	546		1.3%
U.S. Decennial Census

=== 2010 census ===
As of the census of 2010, there were 539 people, 201 households, and 159 families living in the city. The population density was 1,146.8 inhabitants per square mile (442.8/km^{2}). There were 231 housing units at an average density of 491.5 per square mile (189.8/km^{2}). The racial makeup of the city was 99.3% White, 0.4% Asian, and 0.4% from two or more races. Hispanic or Latino of any race were 0.6% of the population.

There were 201 households, of which 38.3% had children under the age of 18 living with them, 73.1% were married couples living together, 3.5% had a female householder with no husband present, 2.5% had a male householder with no wife present, and 20.9% were non-families. 18.9% of all households were made up of individuals, and 7% had someone living alone who was 65 years of age or older. The average household size was 2.68 and the average family size was 3.09.

The median age in the city was 46.7 years. 28.2% of residents were under the age of 18; 4.9% were between the ages of 18 and 24; 13.6% were from 25 to 44; 42.3% were from 45 to 64; and 10.9% were 65 years of age or older. The gender makeup of the city was 49.2% male and 50.8% female.

=== 2000 census ===
As of the census of 2000, there were 614 people, 215 households, and 176 families living in the city. The population density was 1,186.5 inhabitants per square mile (458.1/km^{2}). There were 224 housing units at an average density of 432.8 per square mile (167.1/km^{2}). The racial makeup of the city was 97.88% White, 0.16% Native American, 1.30% Asian, and 0.65% from two or more races.

There were 215 households, out of which 42.3% had children under the age of 18 living with them, 75.3% were married couples living together, 3.7% had a female householder with no husband present, and 17.7% were non-families. 14.4% of all households were made up of individuals, and 5.6% had someone living alone who was 65 years of age or older. The average household size was 2.86 and the average family size was 3.16.

In the city, the population was spread out, with 29.2% under the age of 18, 5.4% from 18 to 24, 20.7% from 25 to 44, 35.3% from 45 to 64, and 9.4% who were 65 years of age or older. The median age was 42 years. For every 100 females, there were 91.9 males. For every 100 females age 18 and over, there were 87.5 males.

The median income for a household in the city was $150,912, and the median income for a family was $168,868. Males had a median income of $100,000 versus $41,875 for females. The per capita income for the city was $91,844. About 1.8% of families and 2.7% of the population were below the poverty line, including 2.5% of those under age 18 and 16.7% of those age 65 or over.

== Politics ==
Presidential election results 1960–2024

Precinct General Election Results
Year	Republican	Democratic	Third parties
2024	52.9% 198	44.9% 168	2.1% 8
2020	47.7% 200	48.9% 205	3.4% 14
2016	50.3% 181	41.1% 148	8.6% 31
2012	69.0% 276	30.5% 122	0.5% 2
2008	57.0% 221	42.3% 164	0.7% 3
2004	61.7% 245	37.5% 149	0.8% 3
2000	66.3% 256	30.3% 117	3.4% 13
1996	65.1% 222	27.9% 95	9.0% 24
1992	51.2% 194	23.5% 89	25.3% 96
1988	73.2% 281	26.8% 103	0.0% 0
1984	80.9% 284	19.1% 67	0.0% 0
1980	67.6% 248	18.0% 66	14.4% 53
1976	73.3% 255	25.3% 88	1.4% 5
1972	71.7% 246	27.1% 93	1.2% 4
1968	73.2% 232	25.9% 82	0.9% 3
1964	76.1% 232	23.9% 73	0.0% 0
1960	83.2% 248	16.8% 50	0.0% 0
