= Shorewood, Minnesota =

City in Minnesota, United States

Coordinates: 44°54′03″N 93°35′21″W

- City
- Logo

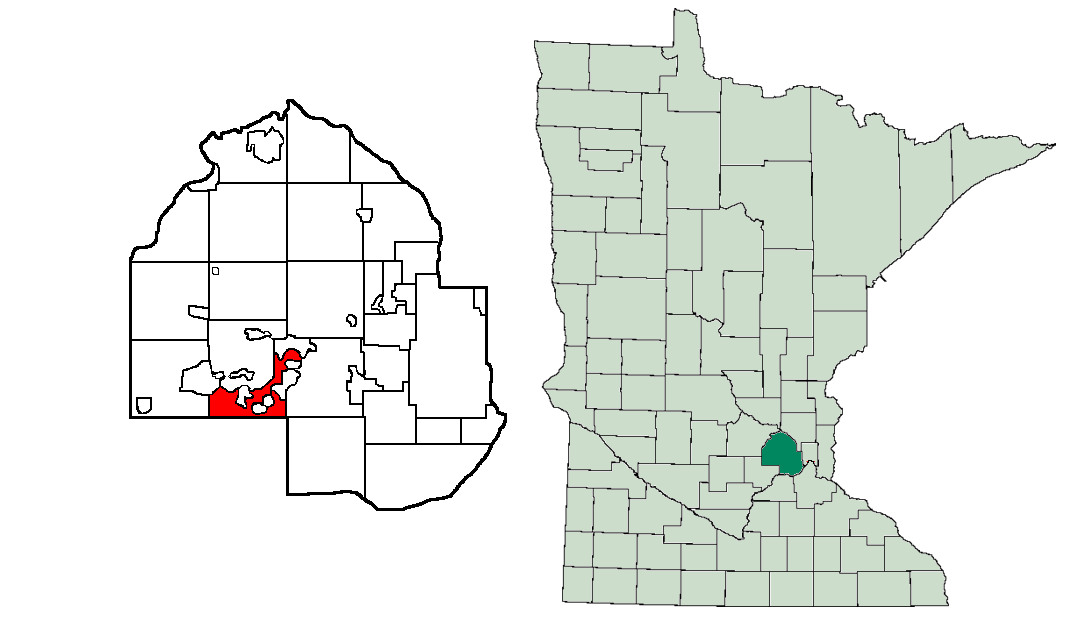
- Location of Shorewood within Hennepin County, Minnesota
- Country: United States
- State: Minnesota
- County: Hennepin
- Incorporated: 1956

Area
  - Total: 8.15 sq mi (21.12 km^{2})
  - Land: 5.31 sq mi (13.75 km^{2})
  - Water: 2.85 sq mi (7.37 km^{2})

Population (2020)
  - Total: 7,783
  - Density: 1,465.7/sq mi (565.91/km^{2})
- Time zone: UTC-6 (Central (CST))
  - Summer (DST): UTC-5 (CDT)
- ZIP codes: 55331, 55364
- Area code: 952
- FIPS code: 27-60016
- GNIS feature ID: 2395877
- Website: www.shorewoodmn.gov

Shorewood is a city in Hennepin County, Minnesota, United States. The population was 7,783 at the 2020 census. The city is located around the southern shore of Lake Minnetonka. State Highway 7 serves as a main route.

== History ==
Shorewood was incorporated out of Excelsior Township in 1956 to avoid annexation by neighboring municipalities.

== Geography ==
According to the United States Census Bureau, the city has a total area of 13.33 square miles (34.52 km^{2}), of which 5.34 square miles (13.83 km^{2}) is land and 7.99 square miles (20.69 km^{2}) is water. It includes the Lake Minnetonka islands of Spray, Shady, and part of Enchanted. These islands are more accessible from the nearby city of Mound that provides them with postal services, fire protection, and schools.

== Demographics ==
Historical population
Census	Pop.	Note	%±
1860	317		—
1870	335		5.7%
1880	513		53.1%
1890	468		−8.8%
1900	681		45.5%
1910	898		31.9%
1920	944		5.1%
1930	925		−2.0%
1940	1,475		59.5%
1950	2,467		67.3%
1960	3,197		29.6%
1970	4,223		32.1%
1980	4,646		10.0%
1990	5,917		27.4%
2000	7,400		25.1%
2010	7,307		−1.3%
2020	7,783		6.5%
U.S. Decennial Census

=== 2020 census ===
As of the 2020 census, Shorewood had a population of 7,783. The median age was 46.7 years. 24.8% of residents were under the age of 18 and 20.0% of residents were 65 years of age or older. For every 100 females there were 96.7 males, and for every 100 females age 18 and over there were 95.4 males age 18 and over.

99.7% of residents lived in urban areas, while 0.3% lived in rural areas.

There were 2,873 households in Shorewood, of which 35.5% had children under the age of 18 living in them. Of all households, 70.1% were married-couple households, 9.9% were households with a male householder and no spouse or partner present, and 16.6% were households with a female householder and no spouse or partner present. About 17.1% of all households were made up of individuals and 10.5% had someone living alone who was 65 years of age or older.

There were 3,023 housing units, of which 5.0% were vacant. The homeowner vacancy rate was 0.7% and the rental vacancy rate was 7.1%.

Racial composition as of the 2020 census
Race	Number	Percent
White	7,054	90.6%
Black or African American	51	0.7%
American Indian and Alaska Native	5	0.1%
Asian	190	2.4%
Native Hawaiian and Other Pacific Islander	2	0.0%
Some other race	55	0.7%
Two or more races	426	5.5%
Hispanic or Latino (of any race)	224	2.9%

=== 2010 census ===
As of the census of 2010, there were 7,307 people, 2,658 households, and 2,131 families living in the city. The population density was 1,368.4 inhabitants per square mile (528.3/km^{2}). There were 2,812 housing units at an average density of 526.6 per square mile (203.3/km^{2}). The racial makeup of the city was 95.8% White, 0.8% African American, 0.3% Native American, 1.4% Asian, 0.1% Pacific Islander, 0.3% from other races, and 1.4% from two or more races. Hispanic or Latino of any race were 1.7% of the population.

There were 2,658 households, of which 38.1% had children under the age of 18 living with them, 71.1% were married couples living together, 6.3% had a female householder with no husband present, 2.7% had a male householder with no wife present, and 19.8% were non-families. 16.5% of all households were made up of individuals, and 7.2% had someone living alone who was 65 years of age or older. The average household size was 2.75 and the average family size was 3.10.

The median age in the city was 45.3 years. 27.1% of residents were under the age of 18; 5.6% were between the ages of 18 and 24; 16.7% were from 25 to 44; 38.1% were from 45 to 64; and 12.5% were 65 years of age or older. The gender makeup of the city was 49.5% male and 50.5% female.

=== 2000 census ===
As of the census of 2000, there were 7,400 people, 2,529 households, and 2,106 families living in the city. The population density was 1,393.5 inhabitants per square mile (538.0/km^{2}). There were 2,599 housing units at an average density of 489.4 per square mile (189.0/km^{2}). The racial makeup of the city was 97.82% White, 0.39% African American, 0.03% Native American, or Indian, 0.89% Asian, 0.19% from other races, and 0.68% from two or more races. Hispanic or Latino of any race were 0.82% of the population.

There were 2,529 households, out of which 45.3% had children under the age of 18 living with them, 75.7% were married couples living together, 4.9% had a female householder with no husband present, and 16.7% were non-families. 13.2% of all households were made up of individuals, and 3.9% had someone living alone who was 65 years of age or older. The average household size was 2.93 and the average family size was 3.22.

In the city, the population was spread out, with 31.6% under the age of 18, 4.5% from 18 to 24, 28.3% from 25 to 44, 27.6% from 45 to 64, and 7.9% who were 65 years of age or older. The median age was 39 years. For every 100 females, there were 100.2 males. For every 100 females age 18 and over, there were 100.6 males.

The median income for a household in the city was $96,589, and the median income for a family was $104,100. Males had a median income of $68,182 versus $41,679 for females. The per capita income for the city was $44,425. About 1.3% of families and 1.7% of the population were below the poverty line, including 1.0% of those under age 18 and 3.0% of those age 65 or over.

== Politics ==
Presidential election results 1960–2024

Precinct General Election Results
Year	Republican	Democratic	Third parties
2024	41.0% 2,232	56.6% 3,081	2.4% 132
2020	41.9% 2,358	56.4% 3,177	1.7% 100
2016	43.6% 2,159	46.7% 2,314	9.7% 480
2012	56.3% 2,810	42.3% 2,109	1.4% 70
2008	51.8% 2,565	46.8% 2,314	1.4% 71
2004	57.1% 2,749	41.8% 2,016	1.1% 53
2000	56.0% 2,526	37.7% 1,702	6.3% 286
1996	51.0% 1,998	38.8% 1,522	10.2% 401
1992	41.2% 1,641	30.1% 1,198	28.7% 1,144
1988	61.2% 1,890	38.8% 1,198	0.0% 0
1984	61.9% 1,619	38.1% 995	0.0% 0
1980	50.8% 1.355	35.2% 939	14.0% 372
1976	55.7% 1,317	41.3% 977	3.0% 71
1972	61.5% 1,125	36.2% 663	2.3% 42
1968	54.4% 928	43.1% 735	2.5% 42
1964	51.1% 809	48.8% 772	0.1% 2
1960	65.6% 952	34.3% 498	0.1% 1

== Education ==
The city of Shorewood is part of the Minnetonka Public School District. Minnewashta Elementary School is located within the city limits and is the largest elementary school in the Minnetonka District.
