= Spring Park, Minnesota =

City in Minnesota, United States

Coordinates: 44°56′07″N 93°37′56″W

Spring Park
- City
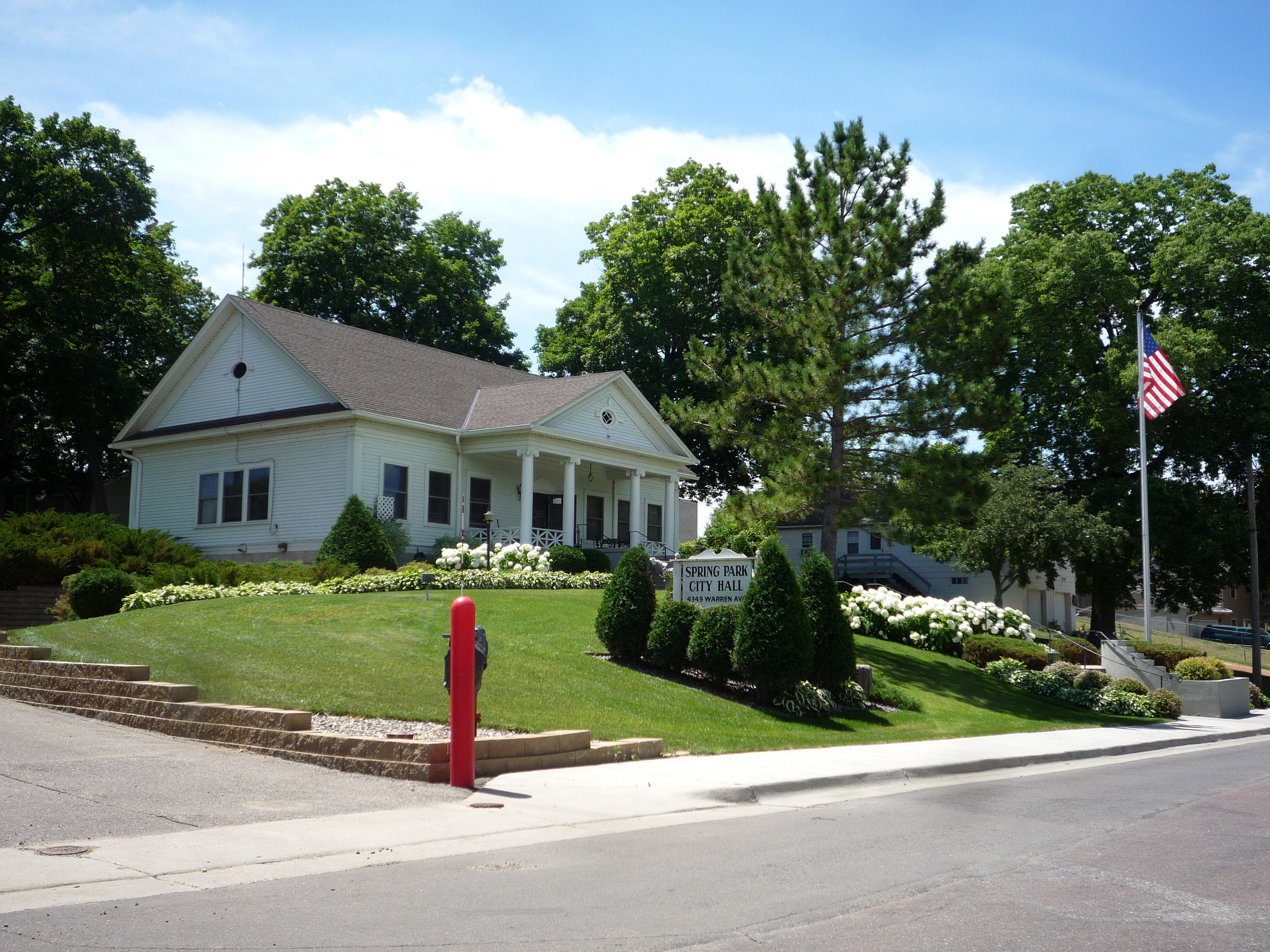
- City hall

- Seal

- Location of Spring Park within Hennepin County, Minnesota
- Country: United States
- State: Minnesota
- County: Hennepin
- Incorporated: 1951

Government
  - Mayor: Jerome P. "Jerry" Rockvam

Area
  - Total: 0.61 sq mi (1.57 km^{2})
  - Land: 0.35 sq mi (0.91 km^{2})
  - Water: 0.25 sq mi (0.65 km^{2})

Population (2020)
  - Total: 1,734
  - Density: 4,911.5/sq mi (1,896.34/km^{2})
- Time zone: UTC-6 (Central (CST))
  - Summer (DST): UTC-5 (CDT)
- ZIP code: 55384
- Area code: 952
- FIPS code: 27-62014
- GNIS feature ID: 2395935
- Website: www.ci.spring-park.mn.us

Spring Park is a city nestled on the shores of Lake Minnetonka in Hennepin County, Minnesota, United States and is about 20 miles west of Minneapolis. The population was 1,734 at the 2020 census.

The small town is rich in history. What is now Spring Park was once the grounds of Hotel Del Otero, a summer lake resort built by James J. Hill.

It was incorporated in 1951 and at that time had a population of a little over 200.

== Geography ==
According to the United States Census Bureau, the city has a total area of 0.62 square miles (1.61 km^{2}), of which 0.36 square miles (0.93 km^{2}) is land and 0.26 square miles (0.67 km^{2}) is water. County 15 and County 51 are two of the main routes.

== Demographics ==
Historical population
Census	Pop.	Note	%±
1960	668		—
1970	1,087		62.7%
1980	1,465		34.8%
1990	1,571		7.2%
2000	1,717		9.3%
2010	1,669		−2.8%
2020	1,734		3.9%
U.S. Decennial Census

=== 2020 census ===
As of the 2020 census, Spring Park had a population of 1,734. The median age was 58.3 years. 8.0% of residents were under the age of 18 and 39.3% of residents were 65 years of age or older. For every 100 females there were 86.9 males, and for every 100 females age 18 and over there were 86.7 males age 18 and over.

100.0% of residents lived in urban areas, while 0.0% lived in rural areas.

There were 1,040 households in Spring Park, of which 9.2% had children under the age of 18 living in them. Of all households, 25.8% were married-couple households, 28.6% were households with a male householder and no spouse or partner present, and 38.7% were households with a female householder and no spouse or partner present. About 57.2% of all households were made up of individuals and 31.7% had someone living alone who was 65 years of age or older.

There were 1,158 housing units, of which 10.2% were vacant. The homeowner vacancy rate was 0.8% and the rental vacancy rate was 5.7%.

Racial composition as of the 2020 census
Race	Number	Percent
White	1,550	89.4%
Black or African American	42	2.4%
American Indian and Alaska Native	7	0.4%
Asian	47	2.7%
Native Hawaiian and Other Pacific Islander	1	0.1%
Some other race	9	0.5%
Two or more races	78	4.5%
Hispanic or Latino (of any race)	23	1.3%

=== 2010 census ===
As of the census of 2010, there were 1,669 people, 897 households, and 314 families living in the city. The population density was 4,636.1 inhabitants per square mile (1,790.0/km^{2}). There were 1,072 housing units at an average density of 2,977.8 units per square mile (1,149.7 units/km^{2}). The racial makeup of the city was 94.1% White, 2.0% African American, 0.1% Native American, 2.6% Asian, 0.2% from other races, and 1.0% from two or more races. Hispanic or Latino of any race were 1.4% of the population.

There were 897 households, of which 15.3% had children under the age of 18 living with them, 24.7% were married couples living together, 6.6% had a female householder with no husband present, 3.7% had a male householder with no wife present, and 65.0% were non-families. 55.0% of all households were made up of individuals, and 22.9% had someone living alone who was 65 years of age or older. The average household size was 1.67 and the average family size was 2.52.

The median age in the city was 49.2 years. 13.1% of residents were under the age of 18; 5.1% were between the ages of 18 and 24; 25.8% were from 25 to 44; 25.8% were from 45 to 64; and 30.1% were 65 years of age or older. The gender makeup of the city was 46.4% male and 53.6% female.

=== 2000 census ===
As of the census of 2000, there were 1,717 people, 930 households, and 321 families living in the city. The population density was 4,724.3 inhabitants per square mile (1,824.1/km^{2}). There were 983 housing units at an average density of 2,704.7 units per square mile (1,044.3 units/km^{2}). The racial makeup of the city was 96.51% White, 1.40% African American, 0.35% Native American, 0.70% Asian, 0.23% from other races, and 0.82% from two or more races. Hispanic or Latino of any race were 0.82% of the population.

There were 930 households, out of which 11.3% had children under the age of 18 living with them, 26.3% were married couples living together, 4.6% had a female householder with no husband present, and 65.4% were non-families. 55.1% of all households were made up of individuals, and 22.5% had someone living alone who was 65 years of age or older. The average household size was 1.63 and the average family size was 2.43.

In the city, the population was spread out, with 9.3% under the age of 18, 8.3% from 18 to 24, 30.3% from 25 to 44, 20.2% from 45 to 64, and 31.9% who were 65 years of age or older. The median age was 47 years. For every 100 females, there were 87.9 males. For every 100 females age 18 and over, there were 85.0 males.

The median income for a household in the city was $36,071, and the median income for a family was $42,969. Males had a median income of $40,750 versus $33,750 for females. The per capita income for the city was $30,290. About 8.0% of families and 8.8% of the population were below the poverty line, including 17.9% of those under age 18 and 6.5% of those age 65 or over.

== Economy ==
Tonka Toys was headquartered in Spring Park between 1946 and 1991.
