= Minnetrista, Minnesota =

City in Minnesota, United States

Minnetrista
- City
- Seal

- Location of Minnetrista within Hennepin County, Minnesota
- Coordinates: 44.9382960°N 93.7177406°W
- Country: United States
- State: Minnesota
- County: Hennepin

Government
  - Mayor: Lisa Whalen

Area
  - Total: 31.05 sq mi (80.41 km^{2})
  - Land: 26.11 sq mi (67.62 km^{2})
  - Water: 4.94 sq mi (12.79 km^{2})
- Elevation: 948 ft (289 m)

Population (2020)
  - Total: 8,262
  - Density: 316.4/sq mi (122.18/km^{2})
- Time zone: UTC-6 (Central (CST))
  - Summer (DST): UTC-5 (CDT)
- Zip Code: 55331
- FIPS code: 27-43306
- GNIS feature ID: 1669532
- Website: www.cityofminnetrista.gov

Minnetrista is a city in Hennepin County, Minnesota, United States. It is located about 23 miles (37 km) west of Minneapolis, and is part of the Minneapolis–Saint Paul metropolitan area. The largely rural Minnetrista has agricultural activity involving corn, soybeans, hay, and horses. In addition to farmland and woods, the city contains several lakes, including part of Lake Minnetonka, the state's ninth-largest. The city's population was 8,262 at the 2020 census. Minnetrista's name originates in the Dakota language, in which minne means "water" and trista means "crooked".

== Geography ==
According to the United States Census Bureau, the city has an area of 30.76 square miles (79.67 km^{2}), of which 25.82 square miles (66.87 km^{2}) is land and 4.94 square miles (12.79 km^{2}) is water. The city is entirely in Hennepin County. County Roads 15, 44, 92, and 110 are its main routes.

Lakes in Minnetrista include Whaletail Lake, Little Long Lake, Mud Lake, Ox Yoke Lake, and Saunders Lake, as well as several bays of Lake Minnetonka. Six Mile Creek runs through the western part of the city and brings the runoff from about 17,000 acres (69 km^{2}) to Lake Minnetonka.

== Demographics ==
Historical population
Census	Pop.	Note	%±
1860	212		—
1870	626		195.3%
1880	844		34.8%
1890	995		17.9%
1900	1,283		28.9%
1910	1,731		34.9%
1920	1,146		−33.8%
1930	1,179		2.9%
1940	1,302		10.4%
1950	1,966		51.0%
1960	2,211		12.5%
1970	2,878		30.2%
1980	3,236		12.4%
1990	3,439		6.3%
2000	4,358		26.7%
2010	6,384		46.5%
2020	8,262		29.4%
U.S. Decennial Census

=== 2020 census ===
As of the 2020 census, Minnetrista had a population of 8,262. The median age was 40.6 years. 28.9% of residents were under the age of 18 and 12.9% of residents were 65 years of age or older. For every 100 females there were 101.2 males, and for every 100 females age 18 and over there were 99.8 males age 18 and over.

40.7% of residents lived in urban areas, while 59.3% lived in rural areas.

There were 2,765 households in Minnetrista, of which 44.6% had children under the age of 18 living in them. Of all households, 76.7% were married-couple households, 8.1% were households with a male householder and no spouse or partner present, and 10.4% were households with a female householder and no spouse or partner present. About 10.3% of all households were made up of individuals and 5.1% had someone living alone who was 65 years of age or older.

There were 2,962 housing units, of which 6.7% were vacant. The homeowner vacancy rate was 1.2% and the rental vacancy rate was 6.6%.

Racial composition as of the 2020 census
Race	Number	Percent
White	7,582	91.8%
Black or African American	53	0.6%
American Indian and Alaska Native	9	0.1%
Asian	127	1.5%
Native Hawaiian and Other Pacific Islander	0	0.0%
Some other race	54	0.7%
Two or more races	437	5.3%
Hispanic or Latino (of any race)	201	2.4%

=== 2010 census ===
As of the census of 2010, there were 6,384 people, 2,176 households, and 1,823 families living in the city. The population density was 247.3 inhabitants per square mile (95.5/km^{2}). There were 2,336 housing units at an average density of 90.5 per square mile (34.9/km^{2}). The racial makeup of the city was 96.3% White, 0.7% African American, 0.1% Native American, 1.6% Asian, 0.3% from other races, and 1.1% from two or more races. Hispanic or Latino of any race were 1.8% of the population.

There were 2,176 households, of which 45.5% had children under the age of 18 living with them, 76.7% were married couples living together, 4.2% had a female householder with no husband present, 2.9% had a male householder with no wife present, and 16.2% were non-families. 12.2% of all households were made up of individuals, and 3.9% had someone living alone who was 65 years of age or older. The average household size was 2.93 and the average family size was 3.21.

The median age in the city was 39.7 years. 31.2% of residents were under the age of 18; 4.2% were between the ages of 18 and 24; 25.1% were from 25 to 44; 31% were from 45 to 64; and 8.7% were 65 years of age or older. The gender makeup of the city was 50.7% male and 49.3% female.

=== 2000 census ===
As of the census of 2000, there were 4,358 people, 1,505 households, and 1,249 families living in the city. The population density was 166.9 inhabitants per square mile (64.4/km^{2}). There were 1,567 housing units at an average density of 60.0 per square mile (23.2/km^{2}). The racial makeup of the city was 97.06% White, 0.34% African American, 0.21% Native American, 1.47% Asian, 0.50% from other races, and 0.41% from two or more races. Hispanic or Latino of any race were 0.67% of the population. 32.0% were of German, 16.1% Norwegian, 9.9% Swedish, 7.4% Irish and 6.0% English ancestry according to Census 2000.

There were 1,505 households, out of which 40.7% had children under the age of 18 living with them, 76.3% were married couples living together, 4.4% had a female householder with no husband present, and 17.0% were non-families. 13.2% of all households were made up of individuals, and 2.5% had someone living alone who was 65 years of age or older. The average household size was 2.90 and the average family size was 3.20.

In the city, the population was spread out, with 29.3% under the age of 18, 5.3% from 18 to 24, 27.8% from 25 to 44, 30.3% from 45 to 64, and 7.4% who were 65 years of age or older. The median age was 39 years. For every 100 females, there were 105.5 males. For every 100 females age 18 and over, there were 102.6 males.

The median income for a household in the city was $90,347, and the median income for a family was $93,104. Males had a median income of $65,395 versus $41,645 for females. The per capita income for the city was $40,217. About 2.1% of families and 2.8% of the population were below the poverty line, including 0.9% of those under age 18 and 5.8% of those age 65 or over.

== Politics ==
United States presidential election results for Minnetrista, Minnesota
Year	Republican		Democratic		Third party(ies)	
Year	No.	%	No.	%	No.	%
1956	594	59.05%	410	40.76%	2	0.20%
1960	521	58.15%	371	41.41%	4	0.45%
1964	485	50.79%	468	49.01%	2	0.21%
1968	538	48.95%	501	45.59%	60	5.46%
1972	747	59.95%	468	37.56%	31	2.49%
1976	848	55.94%	648	42.74%	20	1.32%
1980	902	57.53%	499	31.82%	167	10.65%
1984	1,166	68.59%	534	31.41%	0	0.00%
1988	1,088	62.75%	646	37.25%	0	0.00%
1992	866	40.75%	636	29.93%	623	29.32%
1996	1,063	51.40%	760	36.75%	245	11.85%
2000	1,494	59.69%	866	34.60%	143	5.71%
2004	2,109	64.03%	1,148	34.85%	37	1.12%
2008	2,205	59.71%	1,427	38.64%	61	1.65%
2012	2,671	65.55%	1,342	32.93%	62	1.52%
2016	2,427	55.67%	1,573	36.08%	360	8.26%
2020	3,103	54.79%	2,454	43.33%	106	1.87%
2024	3,239	52.39%	2,813	45.50%	131	2.12%

== Education ==
Waconia Public Schools and Westonka Public Schools and Watertown Mayer operate area public schools, including Waconia High School and Westonka High School.
