= Sellner Manufacturing =

Defunct amusement ride manufacturer

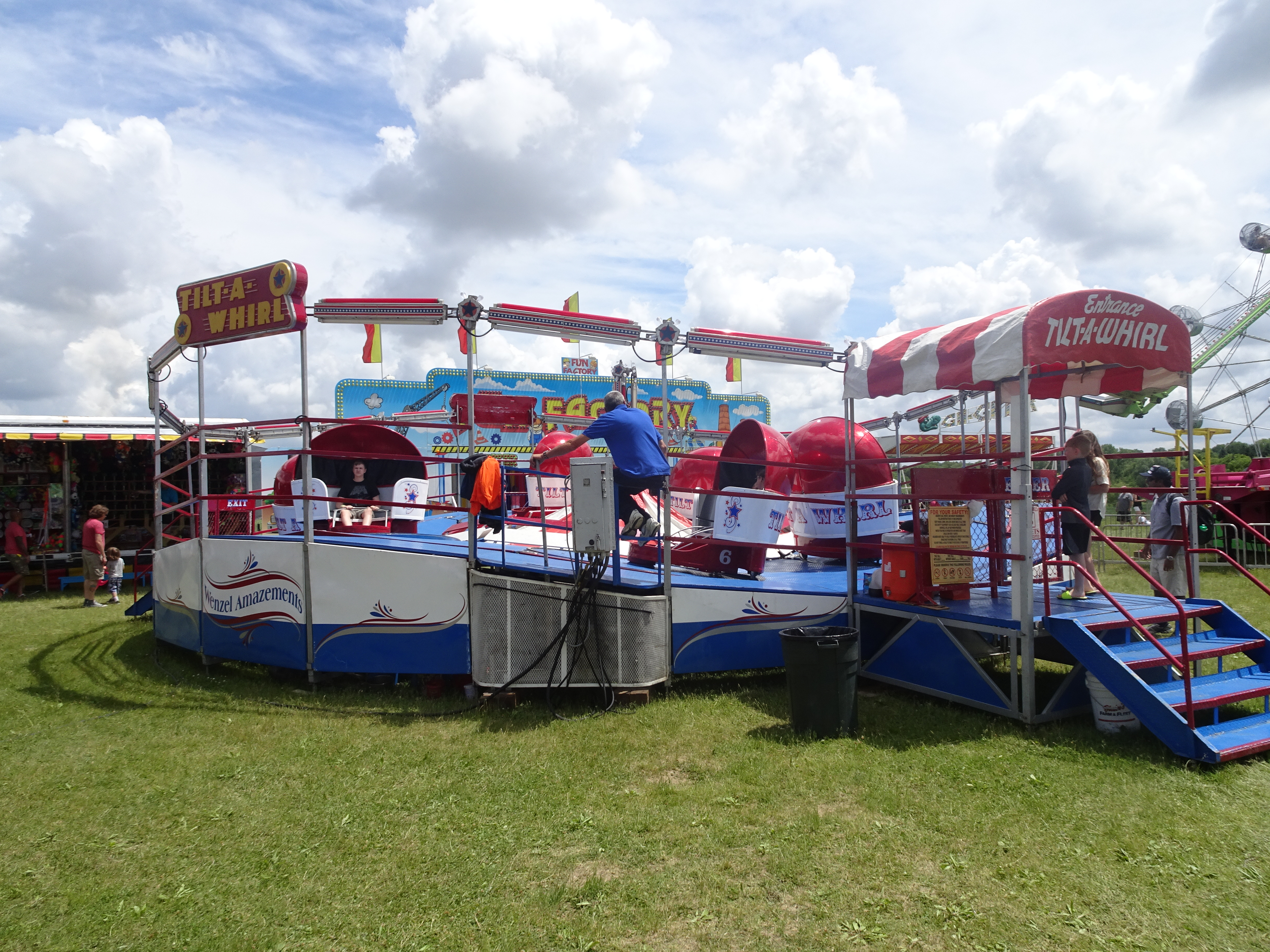
Photo of a Tilt-A-Whirl

Sellner Manufacturing was an amusement ride manufacturing company based in Faribault, Minnesota, best known for inventing the Tilt-A-Whirl.

== History ==
Herbert Sellner, the founder of Sellner Manufacturing, was born in Faribault in 1887 to Frederick and Charlotte Luck Sellner, who were German immigrants. His father was a skilled cabinetmaker.

Around 1908, Sellner established the Sellner Woodcraft Company in Faribault to manufacture mission furniture, lamps, and other wood articles. The company was later sold and became Daisy Woodcraft. He also created Ideal Lamp Company. A 1917 catalog listed magazine racks, smoking and telephone stands, folding dining tables, and lamps with leaded stained glass shades for sale. When World War I affected supply availability, Sellner began manufacturing wood toys for children.

By 1923, Sellner had invented a water toboggan slide and a water wheel, both of which became popular at beaches. The water toboggan slide was 30 feet high with a 100 foot track and included 12 toboggans; it was priced at fifty cents a ride. The slide became popular in the United States, Canada, Switzerland, Jamaica, and Sweden. Sellner applied for a patent for the water wheel, which included a diving platform, in 1925. Swimmers would lie on the wheel, and spin or dive into the water. He also invented "The Swooper" in 1928, which was an elevated oval Ferris wheel-esque ride, but only about fifteen were built.

The most popular invention of Sellner Manufacturing was the Tilt-A-Whirl. The first Tilt-A-Whirl was built and patented in 1926 in Faribault, and appeared at the 1926 Minnesota State Fair, receiving 4,233 riders over the seven days that the fair was open. Each ride cost fifteen cents. It was then purchased for $4,500 by Wildwood Amusement Park in White Bear Lake for the 1927 season. The first fourteen Tilt-A-Whirls were made at Sellner's home.

In 1927, Sellner built a factory at 515 Fowler Street in Faribault to accommodate his growing business. Sellner died in 1940 of leukemia, but his company continued on, with the company remaining in the family. By 1938, 143 Tilt-A-Whirls operated in England, Sweden, New Zealand, and Mexico City. When World War II caused a shortage of both workers and materials, Sellner factory employees made bomb carts as well.

In 1987, the Sellner company introduced several new ride models, including Spin-the-Apple, Berry-Go-Round, Bear Affair, and Barrel-Of-Fun. Other rides that followed included Dizzy Dragons, Pumpkin Patch, and Windjammer. New color pallets were made available for purchase on the Tilt-A-Whirl, including lime green and purple or white and fuchsia, and the Generation Five Tilt-A-Whirl, with fiberglass cars and an open design, was introduced in 2004 as an alternative to the traditional model.

Economic downturns in the early 2000s hurt Sellner Manufacturing and led to a slump in sales. After it missed payments on a loan from the Economic Development Authority of Faribault, the business was sold in 2011 to Larson International, Inc., of Plainview, Texas. Larson International continues to manufacture the Tilt-A-Whirl and the other Sellner rides.

== Legacy ==
In 2007, Sellner's Tilt-A-Whirl was proposed as the official Minnesota State Amusement Ride.

The Tilt-A-Whirl is mentioned in Bruce Springsteen's 1973 song "4th of July, Asbury Park (Sandy)".

A Tilt-A-Whirl was refurbished on the History Channel's American Restoration.

In 2015, a rusting Tilt-A-Whirl car located in a junk yard in Faribault was restored and placed on display in downtown Faribault to honor the history of the Tilt-A-Whirl. Several restored Tilt-A-Whirl cars are now located throughout the city.

A mural paying homage to Sellner Manufacturing is in downtown Faribault on the back of the Paradise Center for the Arts.
