= Transportation in Minnesota =

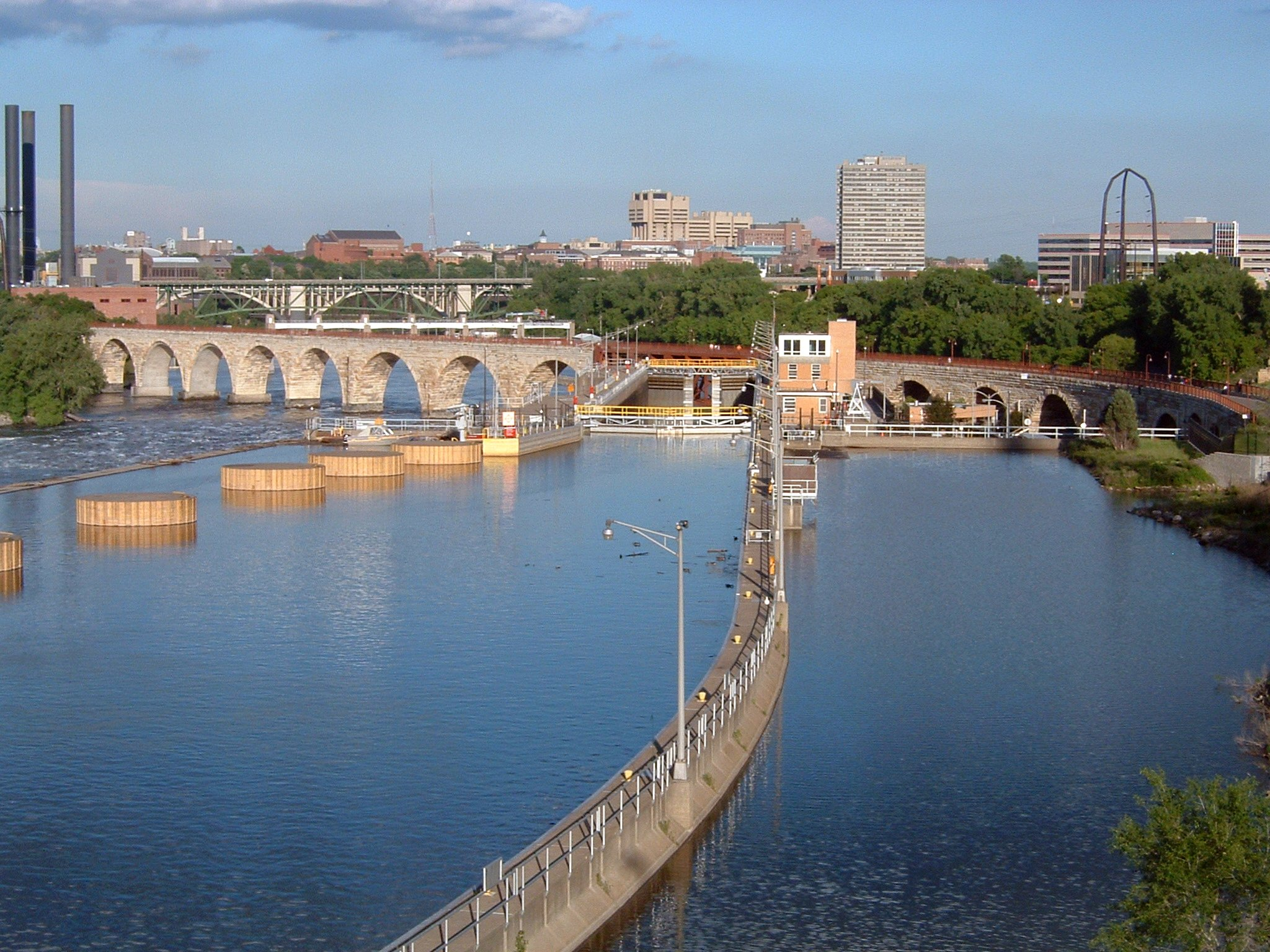
The Stone Arch Bridge and lock at St. Anthony Falls in Minneapolis

Transportation in the U.S. state of Minnesota consists of a complex network of roadways, railways, waterways and airports. The transportation system is generally overseen by the Minnesota Department of Transportation, a cabinet-level agency of the state government. Additionally, regional governments such as the Metropolitan Council have authority over regional planning for the transportation system and local governments such as cities and counties oversee the local transportation network.

== Ground transportation ==
Almost all north–south through railroads and long-distance four-lane freeways in Minnesota have a connection to Minneapolis–Saint Paul metropolitan area. Most east–west through routes do also, except for a northern corridor from the North Dakota border to the port of Duluth/Superior comprising two BNSF rail routes and U.S. Route 2, and a corridor across southern Minnesota from South Dakota to the Mississippi River and Wisconsin including I-90, Minnesota State Highway 60, U.S. Route 14, and the DM&E Railroad.

=== Highway transportation ===
Minnesota's major Interstate Highways are I-35, I-90, and I-94. I-535 is a spur route from Duluth to Superior, Wisconsin. In the Twin Cities I-35 splits into I-35W through Minneapolis and I-35E through St. Paul. I-94 has one spur, Interstate 394 from Minneapolis to the western suburbs, and two loop routes, Interstate 494 and Interstate 694, which form a beltway around the Twin Cities.

The interstate highways are part of a class of routes known as interregional corridors, which also includes U.S. Routes 2, 8, 10, 14, 52, 53, 61, 63, 169, and 212 and Minnesota State Highways 23, 34, 36, 60, 210, and 371. Interregional corridors represent two percent of the state's highways but account for one-third of all vehicle miles traveled. Less heavily traveled regional corridors include U.S. Routes 12, 59, 71, and 75, and a number of state highways.

The Minnesota Legislature identified many of the original trunk highways in the state in the state Constitution by constitutional amendment. A 1920 amendment laid out seventy routes connecting a number of cities. Today, these Constitutional Routes are made up of interstates, U.S. highways, and state highways. While these routes were identified by the legislature, many of the routes were vaguely described in law and effectively they cease to have major impact on the transportation system today.

=== Bus services ===
==== Transit buses ====
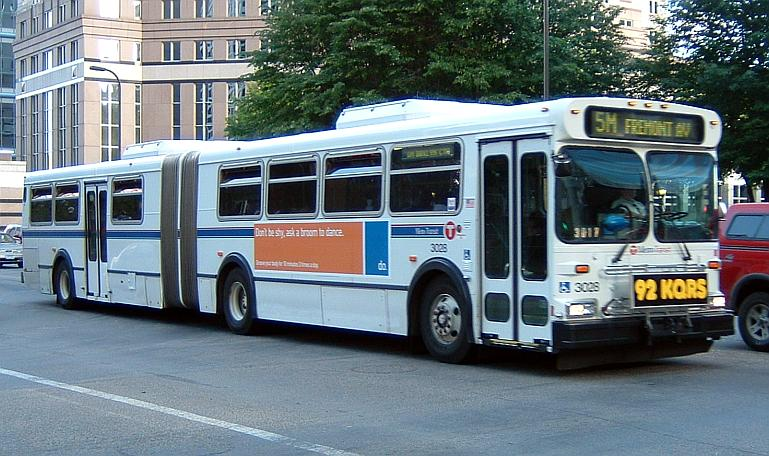
An articulated bus in Minneapolis

Regular route bus transit systems exist in Rochester, Winona, Duluth, St. Cloud, East Grand Forks, Mankato (Mankato Transit System), Moorhead and the Minneapolis–St. Paul area. The last is served by the Metro Transit system, which has an extensive system with over 100 routes. Some portions of the Twin Cities region have opted out of service from Metro Transit and have created their own transit systems. SouthWest Transit and the Minnesota Valley Transit Authority are two major "opt out" transit providers that serve the southwestern and south-central portions of Scott, Dakota and Carver counties.

Arrowhead Transit, established in 1974, is the primary provider of public transportation in the Arrowhead Region. Arrowhead Transit is largest rural public transportation system in Minnesota. The operate in 10 northeastern Minnesota Counties: Aitkin County, Carlton County, Chisago County, Cook County, Isanti County, Itasca County, Koochiching County, Lake County, Pine County, and St. Louis County. Covering 21,968 square miles, Arrowhead Transit is approximately seven times the size of the seven-county Minneapolis–Saint Paul metro, making is the second-largest rural transit system in the United States.

Many rural areas and smaller towns also have rural bus service, though many of those are dial-a-ride services instead of using fixed routes. All but four Minnesota counties have some form of public transit service.

==== Intercity bus lines ====
Intercity bus service on a skeletal network of lines is provided by Jefferson Lines, Greyhound Lines, and Megabus. Jefferson Lines, which is based in Minneapolis, provides the largest number of intercity bus routes and serves the largest number of cities. The other providers focus on providing express service with limited numbers of stops. The number of intercity bus routes has declined significantly since the early 1990s, and several routes went away when Greyhound restructured in the middle of the 2000s decade. Greyhound was founded in Hibbing, Minnesota, but cutbacks have led that city to be cut out of the normal intercity bus route network.

In addition to traditional intercity bus services, a network of independently operated long distance airport shuttles serving Minneapolis–Saint Paul International Airport has developed in recent years. Brainerd, Duluth, Mankato, Rochester, Saint Cloud, Eau Claire (WI), and La Crosse (WI) are all connected by daily scheduled shuttle service with the Minneapolis–Saint Paul airport. The shuttles provide transportation between area cities as well as serving airport passengers.

=== Railroads ===
==== Light rail ====
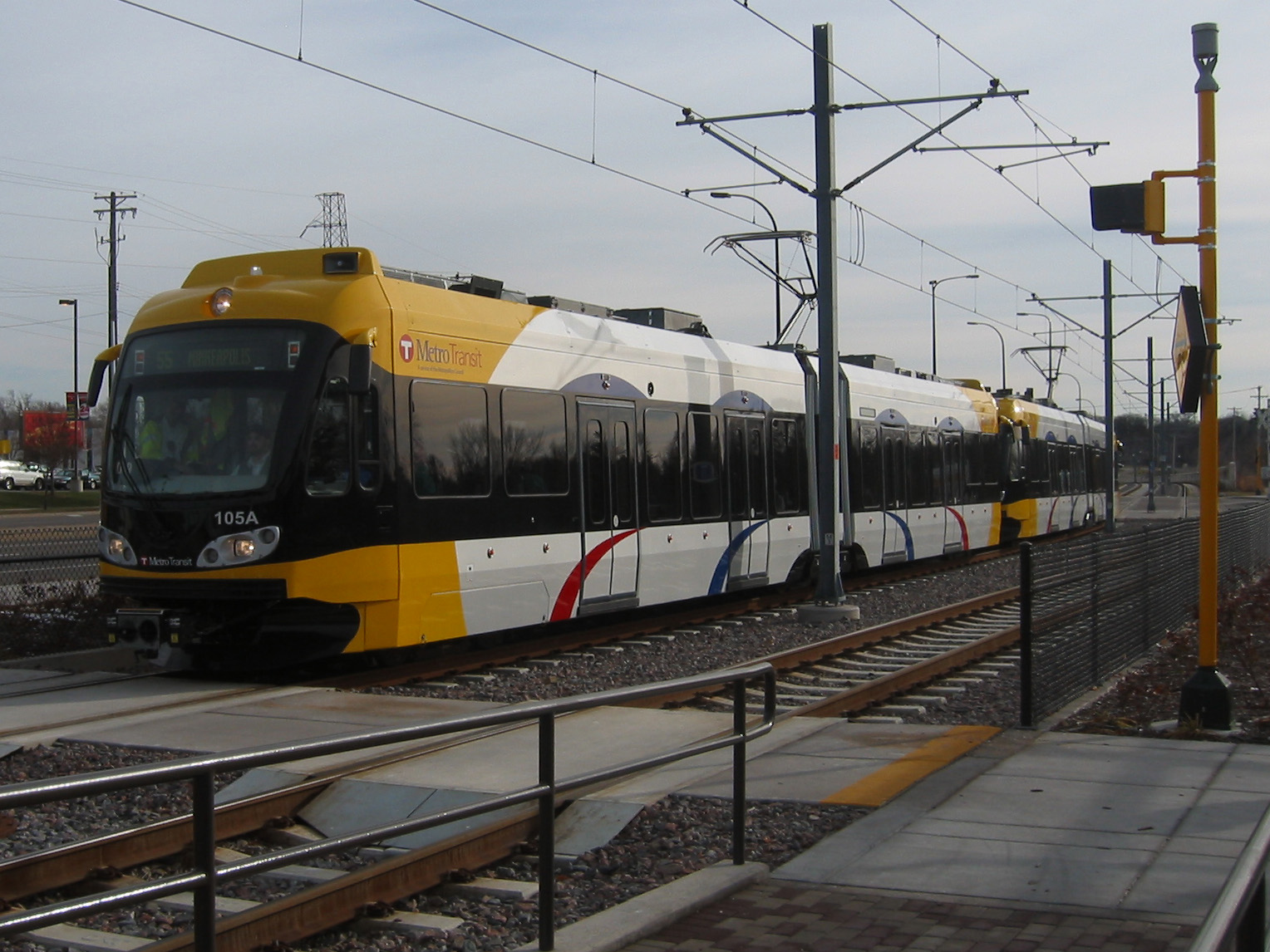
A two-unit METRO Blue Line train approaches 46th Street station from the south.

Decades before Metro Transit, the Twin City Rapid Transit Company operated streetcars in the Twin Cities area from the 1890s until 1954, when buses supplanted the streetcars. Light Rail in Minnesota currently consists of two lines, the Blue Line and Green Line, operated by Metro Transit. Completed in 2004, the Blue Line runs from the Mall of America, through the MSP airport via a tunnel, and along Hiawatha Avenue into downtown Minneapolis. The line has been very successful, receiving a 65% higher ridership than expected in its first year of service. The Green Line, which connects downtown Minneapolis to downtown St. Paul, opened to the public on June 14, 2014.

In the future, other light rail lines may be built. The Metro Green Line Extension from downtown Minneapolis to the southwest metro, was approved by the FTA to begin preliminary engineering in September 2011. In 2006, a constitutional amendment was passed that required sales and use taxes on motor vehicles to fund transportation, with at least 40% dedicated to public transit. A few years later, a regional sales tax was implemented in several counties in the Twin Cities area. It supplies the Counties Transit Improvement Board with funds to help operate and expand the region's bus and rail transit network.

==== Commuter and intercity rail ====
The state is served by one intercity passenger rail line, Amtrak's Empire Builder, which stops daily in each direction at Winona, Red Wing, St. Paul, St. Cloud, Staples, and Detroit Lakes. The Northern Lights Express (NLX) is planned to restore service between Minneapolis and Duluth, which used to have train service until 1985.

==== Freight rail ====
Major freight railroads in Minnesota include BNSF Railway, Union Pacific Railroad, Canadian National Railway, and Canadian Pacific Railway and its Dakota, Minnesota and Eastern Railroad and Soo Line Railroad subsidiaries. Principal ladings include coal from the Powder River Basin to ports and eastern power plants, grain and other agricultural products from farms to processors and ports, taconite (a form of iron ore) from the Iron Range in northeastern Minnesota to Lake Superior ports or on all-rail routes to steel mills, timber and forest products, and intermodal traffic.

Minnesota has had many more railroads and rail lines in the past, and reached a peak of over 9,100 miles (14,600 km) of rails around 1920. In 2007, there was almost exactly half as much track, 4,545 miles (7,314 km). Most of the reduction occurred in the 1970s and 1980s.

=== Bicycle trails ===
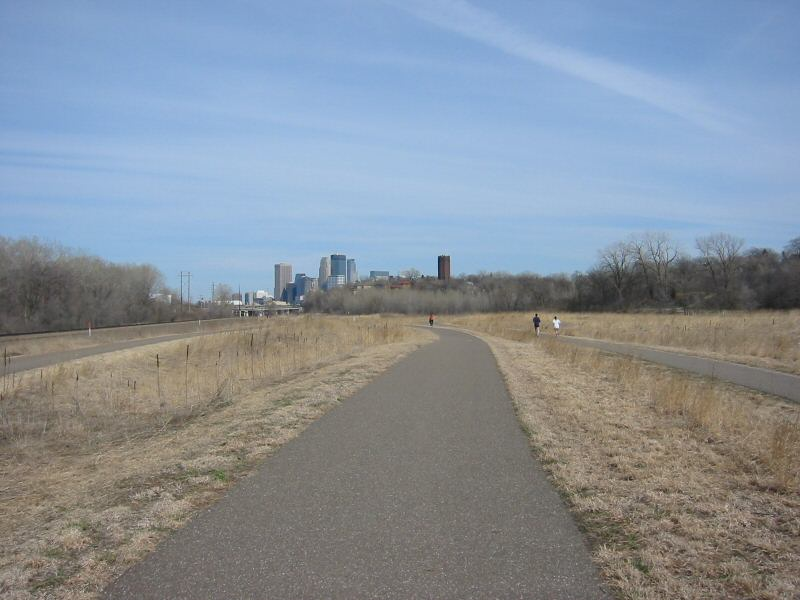
Cedar Lake bike trail in Minneapolis

A 2006 report stated that Minnesota had more miles of bike trails than any other state, and Metro Transit buses feature bike racks for combination commuters. A number of the bike trails are rail trails, utilizing the right-of-ways originally secured for railroads.

=== Minneapolis MN Public Transportation Statistics ===
The average amount of time people spend commuting with public transit in Minneapolis-St. Paul on a weekday is 66 minutes. 19% of public transit riders ride for more than 2 hours every day. The average amount of time people wait at a stop or station for public transit is 13 min, while 14% of riders wait for over 20 minutes on average every day. The average distance people usually ride in a single trip with public transit is 8.3 km, while 20% travel for over 12 km in a single direction.

== Water transportation ==
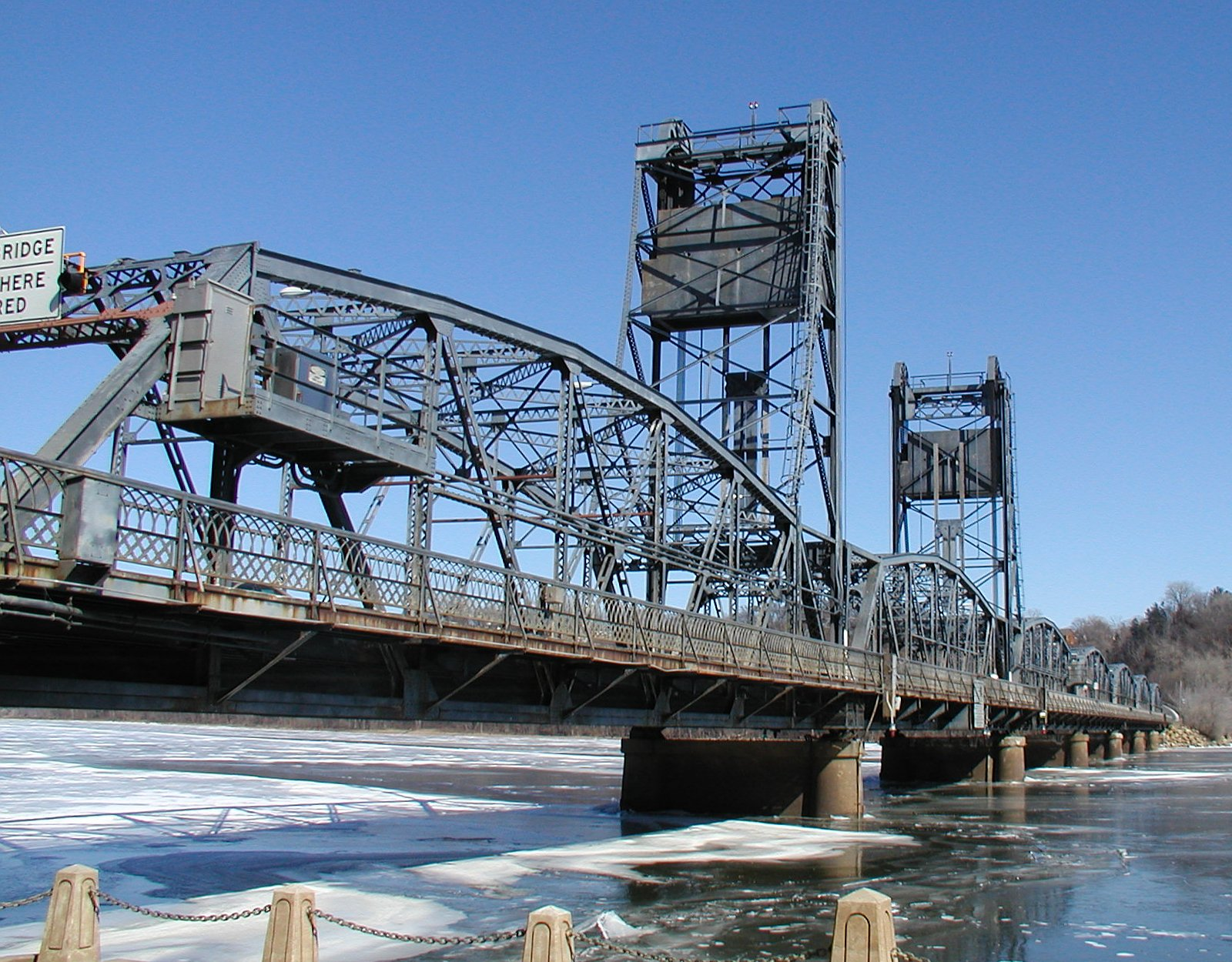
The lift bridge in Stillwater

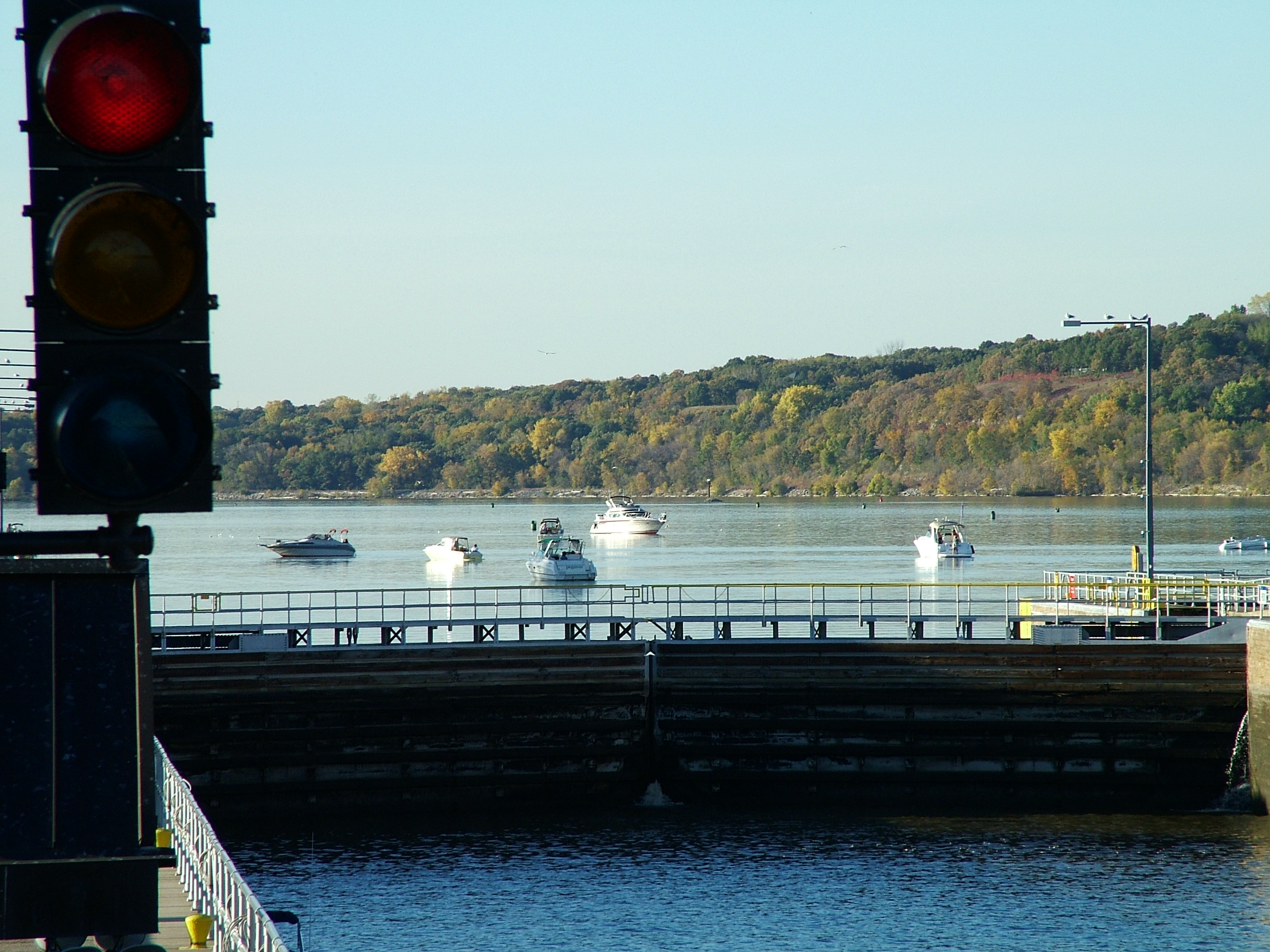
Boats at Lock and Dam No. 2 on the Mississippi River near Hastings

Much of Minnesota's early transportation followed the numerous rivers and lakes. Early European explorers and settlers followed the routes used by the voyageurs and coureurs des bois in the fur trading days, and later on steamboat services operated on the principal rivers. Commercial water transportation is now limited to the shipment of bulk commodities on two routes. Barges haul grain and other products down the Mississippi River system from the ports of St. Paul (the head of navigation), Red Wing and Winona on the Mississippi, and Savage (on the Minnesota River), to downstream river ports, and to ports on the Gulf of Mexico for transshipment to ocean-going cargo ships. Cargo vessels known as lakers haul grain, coal, and iron ore from the Lake Superior ports of Duluth, Superior, Two Harbors, and Silver Bay, through Lake Superior to the lower Great Lakes, while ocean-going ships referred to as salties operate from the Twin Ports through the St. Lawrence Seaway to the Atlantic Ocean.

== Air transportation ==
Minnesota’s principal airport is Minneapolis–St. Paul International Airport (MSP), a major passenger and freight hub for Delta Air Lines. MSP is also the main hub for Minnesota-based Sun Country Airlines, and is served by most other domestic carriers. Large commercial jet service is also provided to and from Duluth International Airport and Rochester International Airport. Scheduled commuter service is available at Bemidji, Brainerd, Hibbing, International Falls, St. Cloud, and Thief River Falls. Hector International Airport at Fargo, North Dakota provides scheduled service to the Fargo-Moorhead area.

== See also ==
- Plug-in electric vehicles in Minnesota
