= Wildwood Amusement Park =

Former amusement park and picnic grounds in Mahtomedi, Minnesota, United States

Coordinates: 45°3′25″N 92°57′33″W

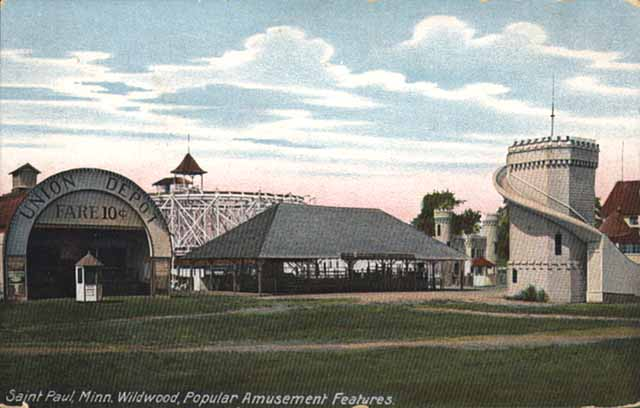
Wildwood Amusement Park 1907

Wildwood Amusement Park was an amusement park and picnic ground that existed from 1889 to 1932 on the southeast shore of White Bear Lake in Mahtomedi, Minnesota, United States. The park was built and operated by the Minneapolis and St. Paul Suburban Railroad Company, a subdivision of the Twin City Rapid Transit Company, which ran a streetcar line from Mahtomedi to nearby St. Paul. It was the sister park of Big Island Amusement Park on Lake Minnetonka, as both were intended to draw crowds of people to opposite ends of the Minneapolis-St. Paul streetcar system on weekends. Wildwood Amusement Park proved to be more successful than Big Island Amusement Park, which closed in 1911, and lasted until 1932 when financial losses brought about its demise.

== History ==
In 1883, the First Mahtomedi Assembly of the Chautauqua Association first platted the city of Mahtomedi. As part of a nationwide education movement known as Chautauqua, the Assembly built a tabernacle in Mahtomedi on the southeast side of White Bear Lake for lecture series, correspondence courses, and other events and meetings intended for adult education. During the summers, as many as 3,000 people sometimes took up temporary residence at the lake in tent villages in pursuit of further education.

By the 1870s, major rail lines had reached the east side of White Bear Lake. Wildwood had already become a popular spot for picnickers, but didn’t yet feature the amusement park and its rides and other attractions.

== Location ==
The Wildwood Amusement Park was located on the southern shore of White Bear Lake, on the border of Mahtomedi and nearby Birchwood. The precise location of the park is still debated, since little of the original structures remain today.

== Park Attractions ==
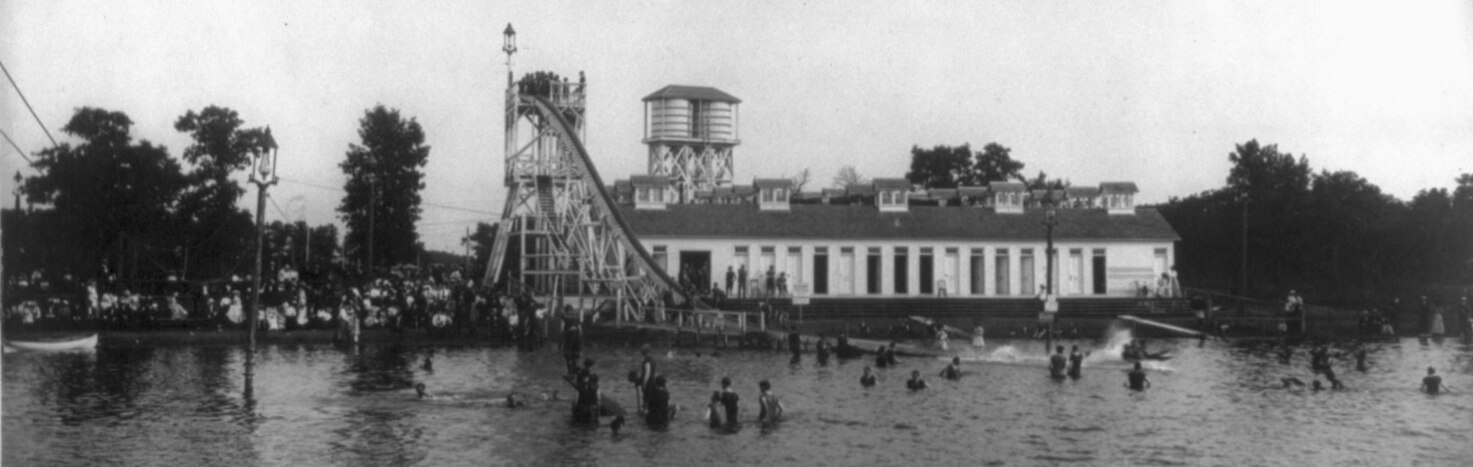
Toboggan slide and bathing pavilion, 1902

Once called the "Coney Island of St. Paul," the Wildwood Park featured numerous attractions. In addition to the popular picnic grounds and amusement rides, there were traveling shows, diving ponies, and hot air balloon rides. A bathhouse operated just west of the rides, and had a water chute and springboards. Athletic types would play baseball at the water’s edge on the beach. Additional activities included orchestral concerts, free dancing lessons, boating, bowling, a carousel, fishing, a penny arcade, a shooting gallery, playgrounds, a postal photo gallery, swings, ball-throwing games, and a twenty-five cent motorboat trip around White Bear Lake.

== Admission ==
Admission to the Wildwood Amusement Park was free.

== Park Decline and Closure ==
The change in transportation and the railroad no longer running to the park was the beginning of the end.

== See also ==
- Trolley park
