= Minnehaha (steamboat) =

US historic restored ship

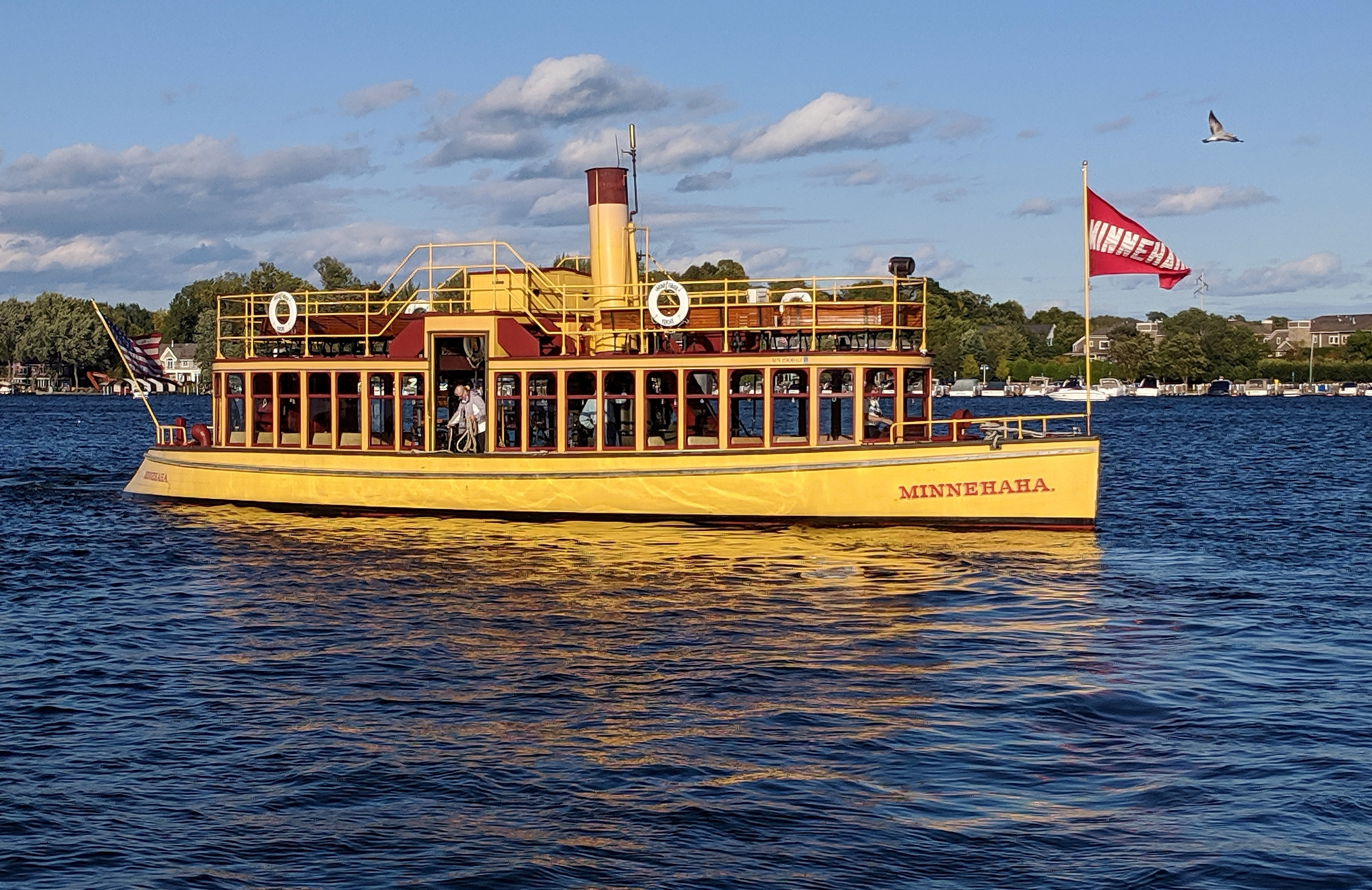
- Steamboat Minnehaha in Excelsior, Minnesota

History

United States
- Name: Minnehaha
- Owner: Twin City Rapid Transit Company (1906-1926); Inland Marine Interpretive Center (1984-1990); Minnesota Transportation Museum (1990-2003); Museum of Lake Minnetonka (2004-2023); Lake Minnetonka Historical Society (2023-present)
- Route: Lake Minnetonka
- Builder: Twin City Rapid Transit Company, Minneapolis, Minnesota
- Launched: 1906; 1996
- In service: 1906-1926; 1996-2019
- Home port: Excelsior, Minnesota, U.S.
- Identification: MN 1906 GF
- Status: Temporarily out of service

General characteristics
- Type: TCRT Express Boat
- Displacement: 55 short tons (49.9 t)
- Length: 70 ft (21.3 m)
- Beam: 14 ft 10 in (4.5 m)
- Draft: 5 ft 7.5 in (1.7 m)
- Decks: 2
- Installed power: 127 hp (94.7 kW)
- Propulsion: 1 × Coal-fired 250 psi (1,724 kPa) water-tube boiler; 1 × 7 to 10 to 18 in (180 to 250 to 460 mm) Triple-expansion condensing steam engine; 1 × 44 in (1,118 mm) diameter bronze quadruple-blade screw
- Speed: 10 knots (19 km/h; 12 mph)
- Capacity: 101 persons
- Crew: 3 (Pilot, Purser, Engineer)
- Minnehaha (steamboat)
- U.S. National Register of Historic Places
- Location within Minnesota Location within the United States
- Location: 140 George Street, Excelsior, Minnesota
- Coordinates: 44°54′11″N 93°34′28″W
- Built: 1906
- NRHP reference No.: 100007073
- Added to NRHP: October 25, 2021

Minnehaha is a steam-powered excursion vessel on Lake Minnetonka in the U.S. state of Minnesota. The vessel was originally in service between 1906 and 1926. After being scuttled in 1926, Minnehaha was raised from the bottom of Lake Minnetonka in 1980, restored, and returned to active service in 1996. The vessel operated uninterrupted on Lake Minnetonka until 2019. It is currently stored in a maintenance facility in the town of Excelsior.

== History ==
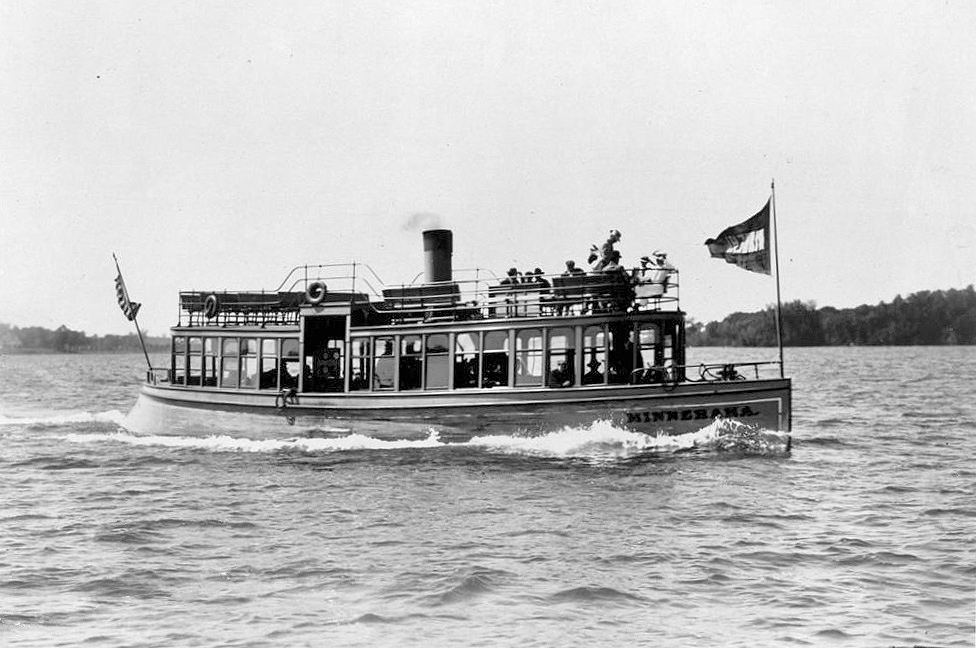
Minnehaha on Lake Minnetonka in 1906

Minnehaha was built by the Twin City Rapid Transit Company (TCRT) in 1906 and provided fast and reliable transportation for the residents of Lake Minnetonka during much of the early twentieth century. She ran alongside five identical sister vessels named Como, Harriet, Hopkins, Stillwater, and White Bear. TCRT had commissioned boat builder Royal C. Moore to design these "Express Boats" in 1905. Each were 70 feet (21 m) long, 14 feet 10 inches (5 m) wide, drew 5 feet 7 inches (2 m) of water, and were powered by a single coal-fired boiler and triple-expansion steam engine. The sleek, launch-style hull of the craft made the boats exceptionally stable and efficient as they cut through the water at a speed of approximately 12 miles per hour (19 km/h). The boats were designed in Wayzata and assembled at TCRT's streetcar shops in south Minneapolis.

Express Boat service first began on May 25, 1906, from Minnetonka Beach. Later that year a streetcar transfer terminal was completed in Excelsior, and all routes (four in total) embarked and disembarked from there. The primary function assigned to the Express Boats was to provide fast and reliable transportation for the seasonal residents of Lake Minnetonka who commuted to work in the Minneapolis–Saint Paul area. The boats stopped at 26 designated landings around the lake. They were designed to closely resemble TCRT's streetcars from the details of their interiors to the yellow and red paint scheme of their exteriors. Because of their appearance and the fact that they were named after popular TCRT streetcar stops, they were nicknamed the "streetcar boats."

The streetcar boats proved to be popular and economically successful for many years. A seventh vessel named Excelsior was added to the fleet in 1915 because of high ridership. However, ridership plummeted when roads were improved around Lake Minnetonka in the early 1920s. TCRT made cuts to steamboat service after 1921 and discontinued all steamboat service on Lake Minnetonka in 1926. Three of the streetcar boats were scuttled that summer, including Minnehaha. Three others were scrapped. One of the vessels, the Hopkins, was sold to a private entity and used as an excursion boat until 1949, when it was also scuttled.

In 1979, a diver named Jerry Provost located the wreck of Minnehaha on the bottom of Lake Minnetonka. One year later, Provost and his associates raised Minnehaha to the surface with the intent of restoring her as a lakeside attraction. However, due to litigation concerning ownership, Minnehaha remained in dry dock for 10 subsequent years. In 1990, title of the vessel was transferred to the Steamboat Division of the Minnesota Transportation Museum and an effort to restore her to operational status soon began. Minnehaha finally returned to passenger service on May 25, 1996, and operated on Lake Minnetonka as an excursion vessel until 2019.

In 2004, ownership of the vessel was transferred to the newly-formed Museum of Lake Minnetonka. At the end of the 2019 season, it was announced that Minnehaha had lost access to her launch site and that the 2020 season would be canceled. She was added to the National Register of Historic Places in 2021. Since 2023, Minnehaha has been owned by the Lake Minnetonka Historical Society (LMHS). According to the society's website, LMHS is committed to returning Minnehaha to active operation on Lake Minnetonka.

== Gallery ==
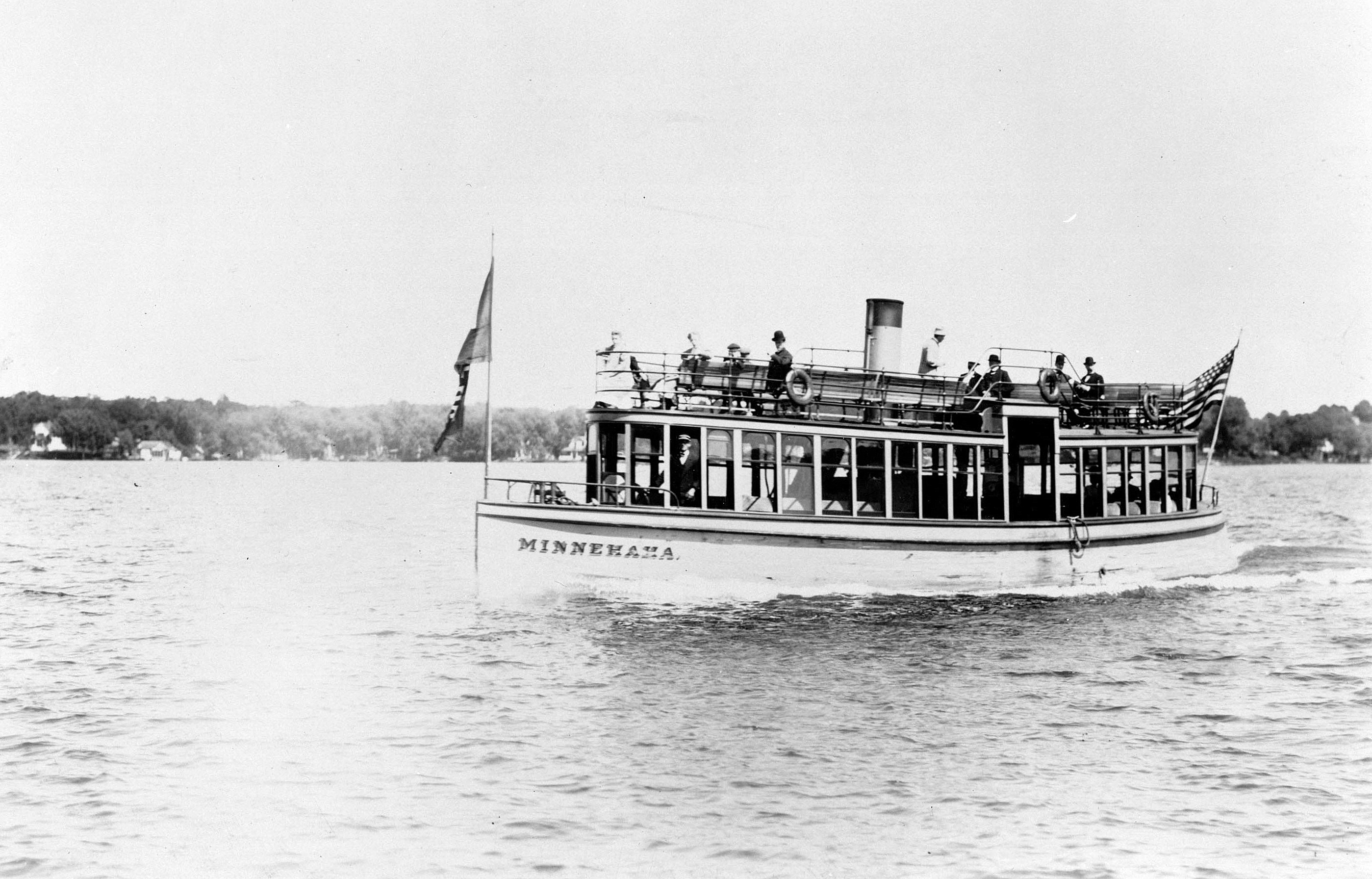
Minnehaha in 1906

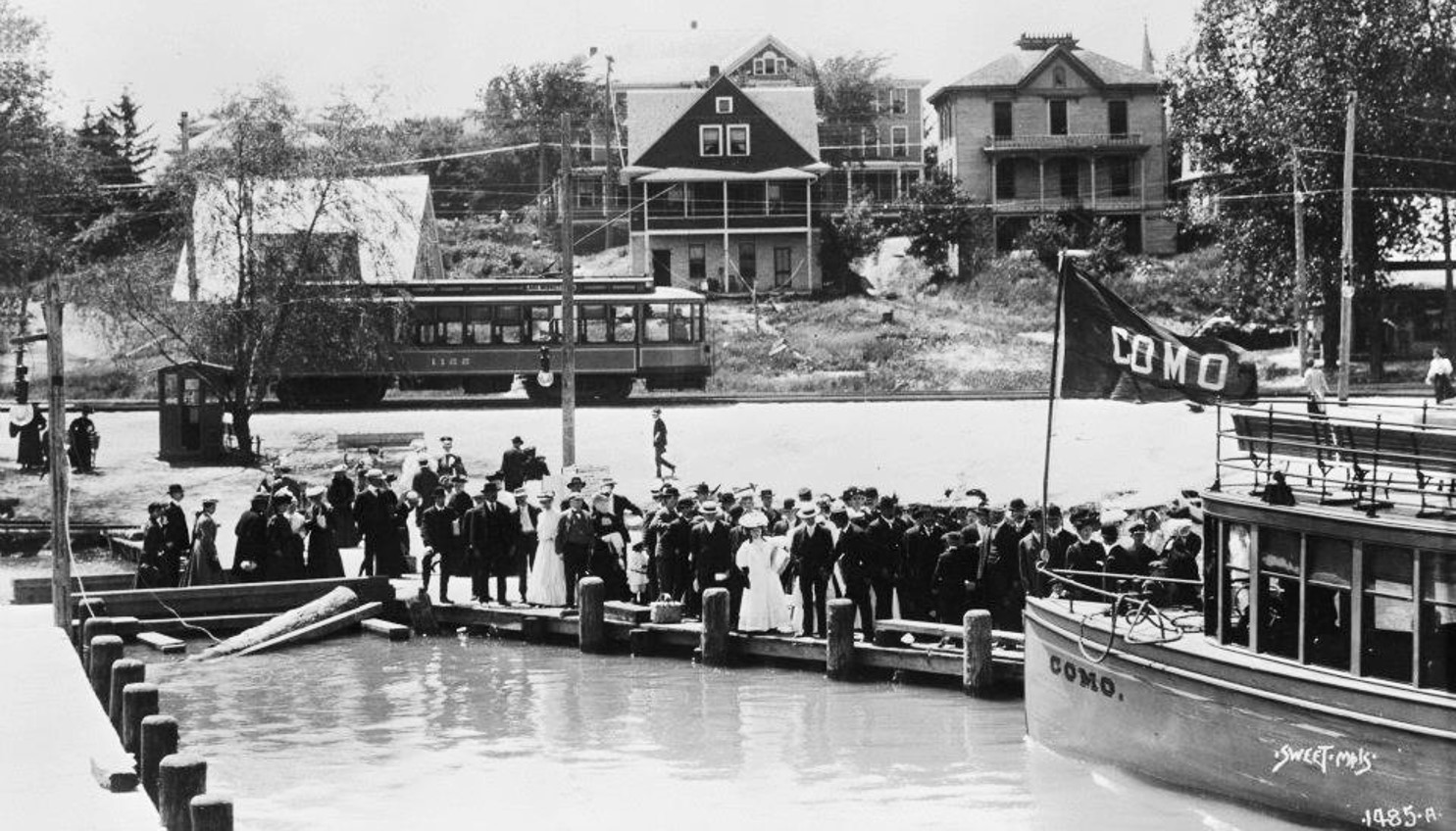
Express Boat Como meeting a streetcar in 1906

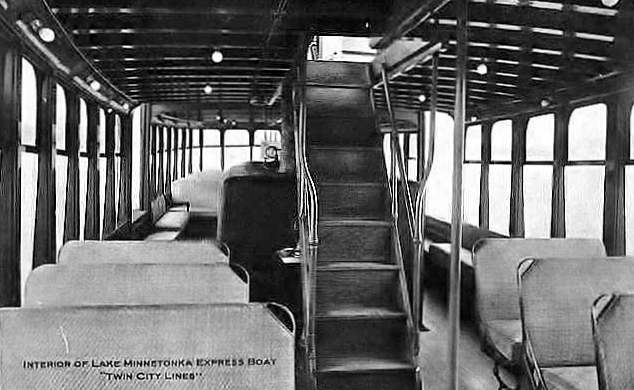
Express Boat interior circa 1906

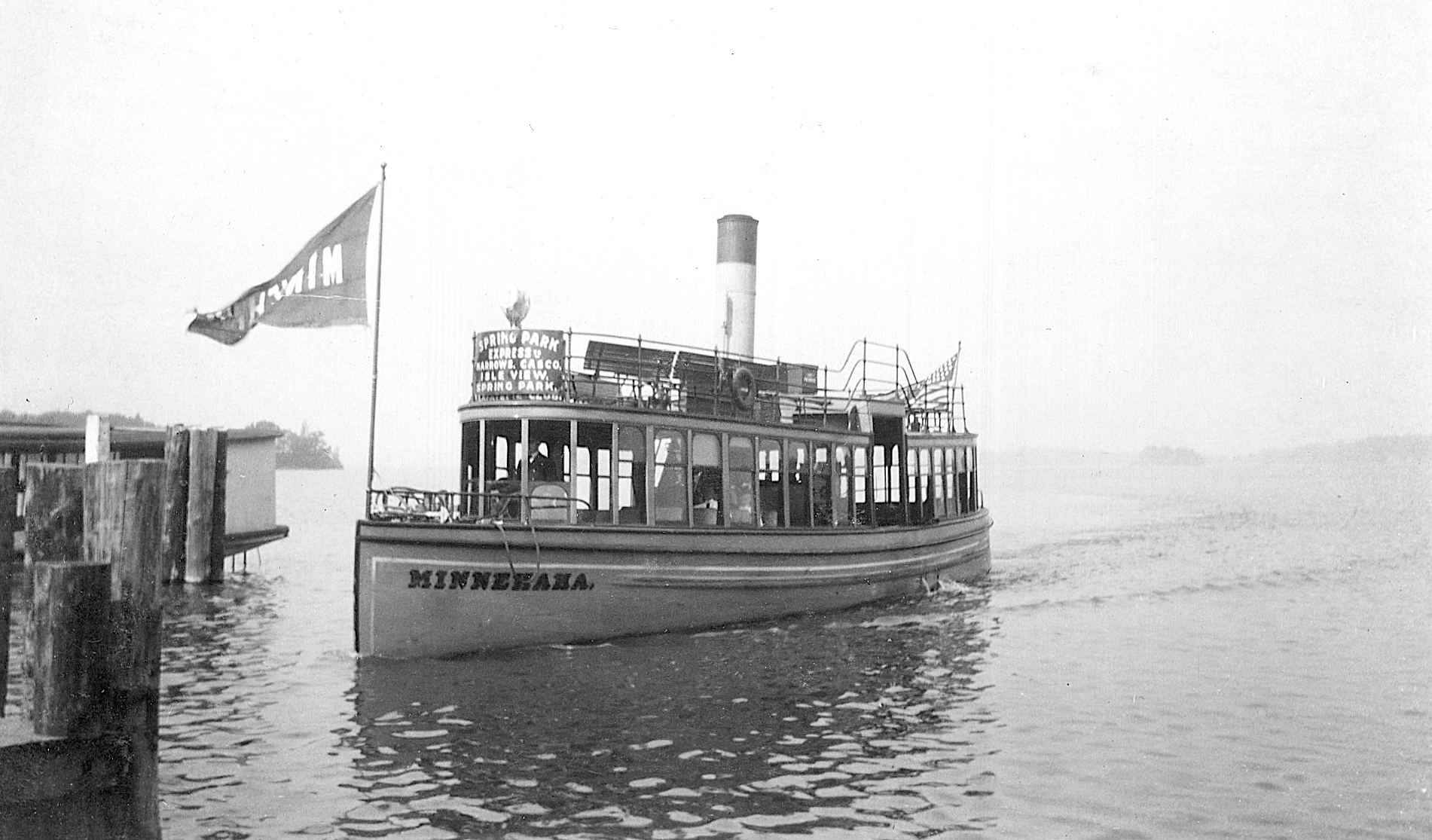
Minnehaha c. 1910

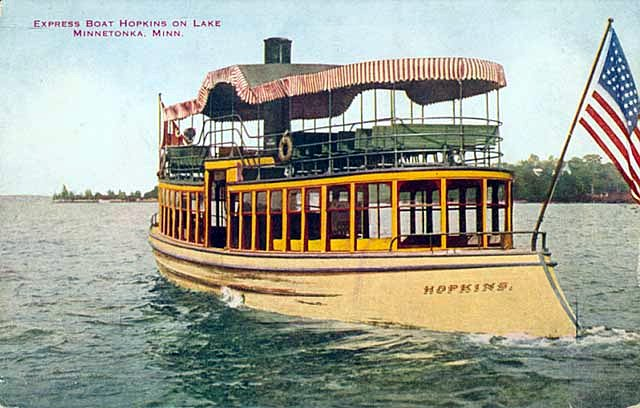
Express Boat Hopkins c. 1912

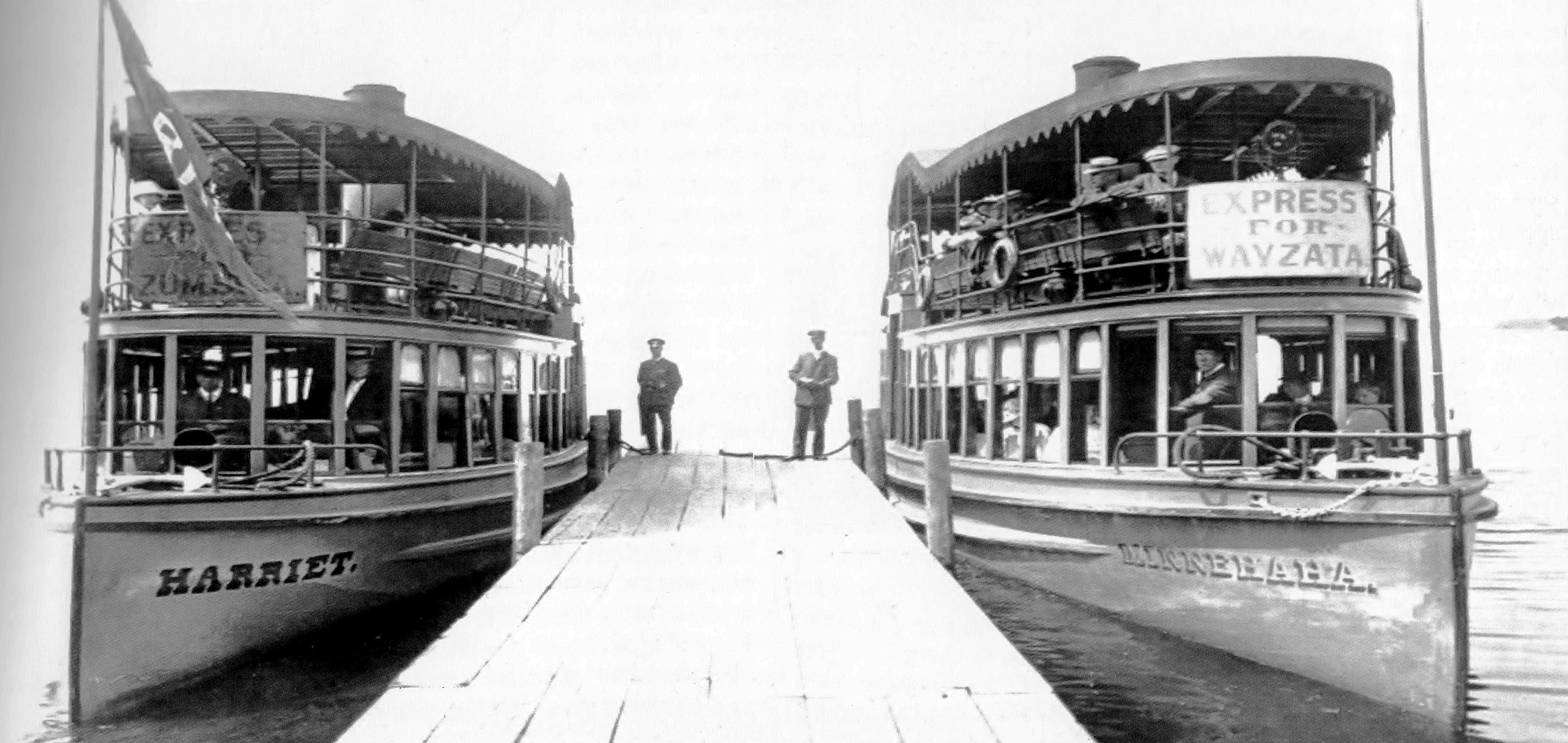
Express Boats Harriet and Minnehaha c. 1912

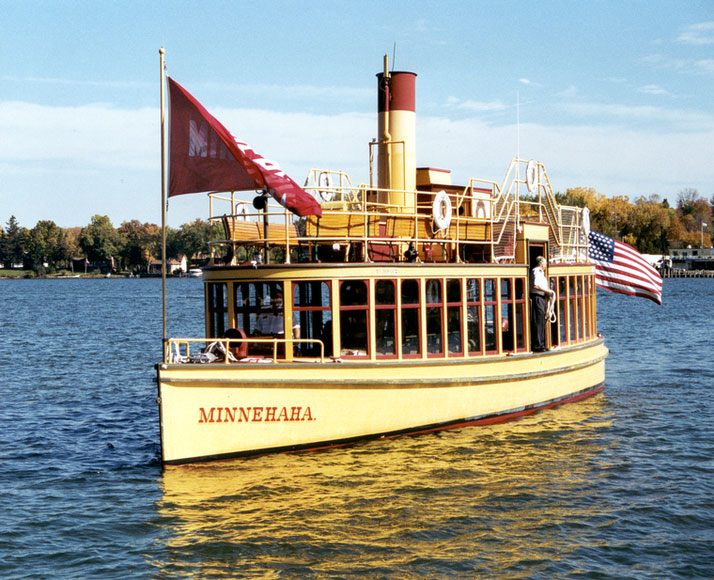
Minnehaha c. 1999

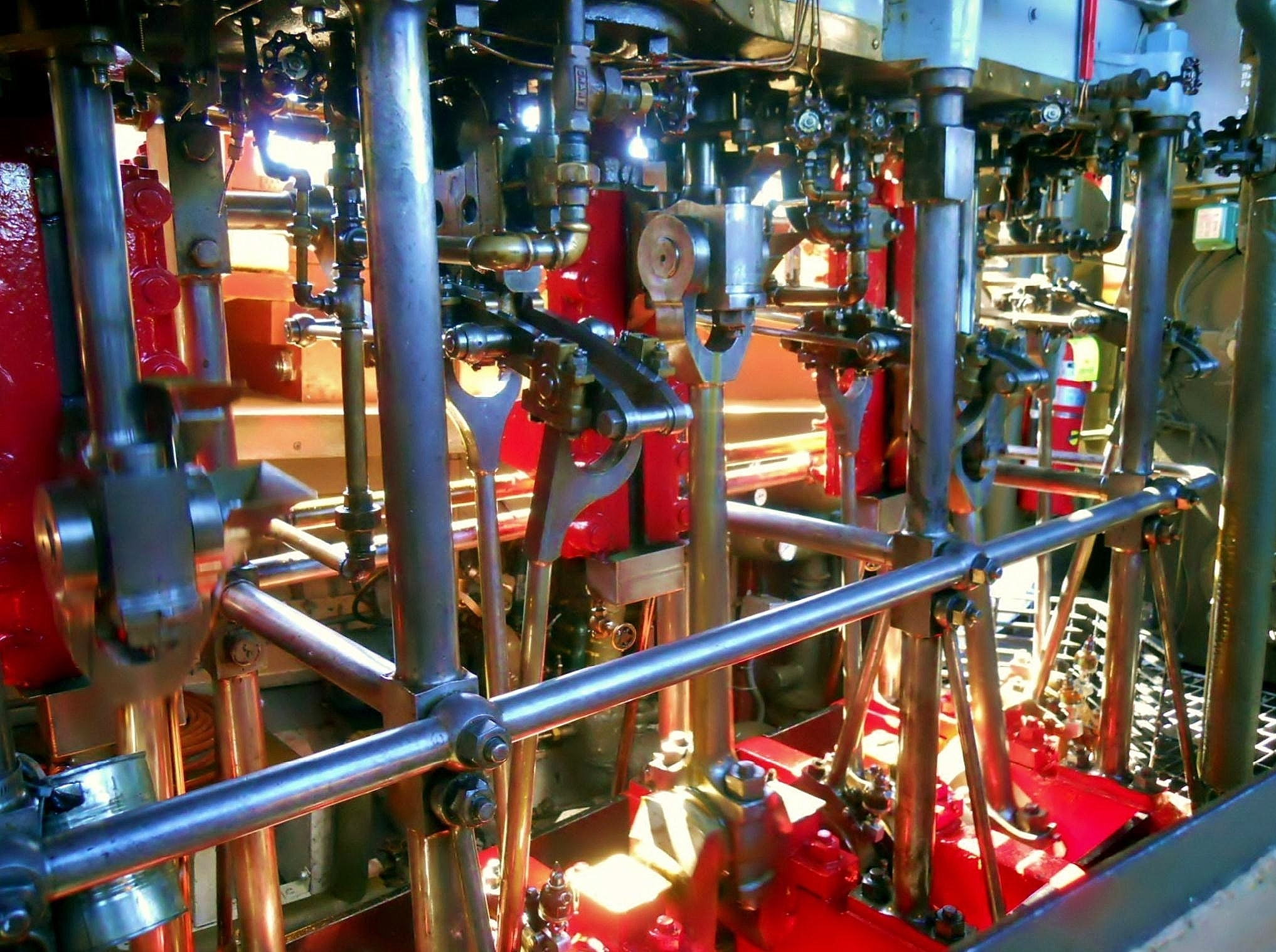
Minnehaha's steam engine

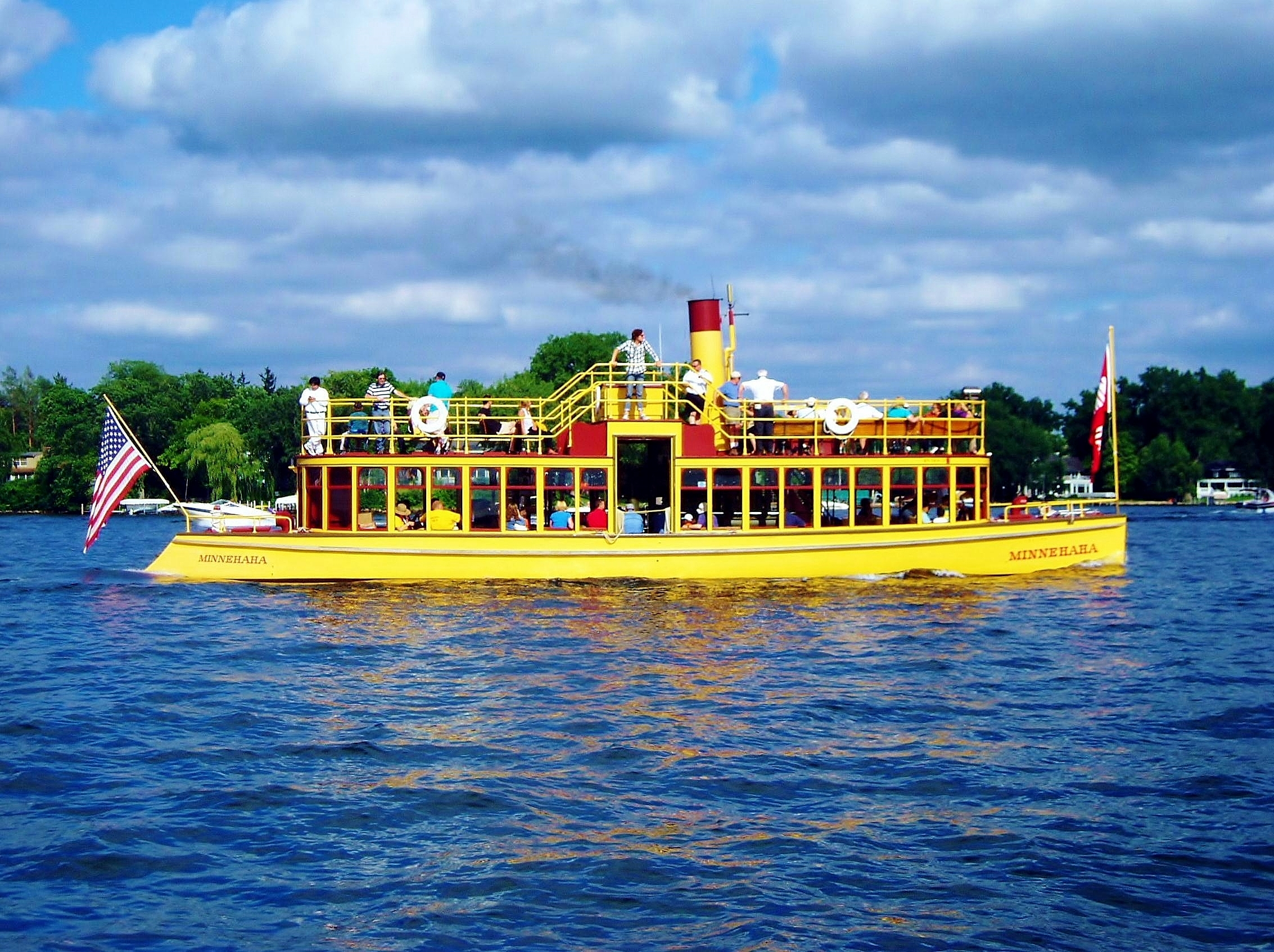
Minnehaha in 2010

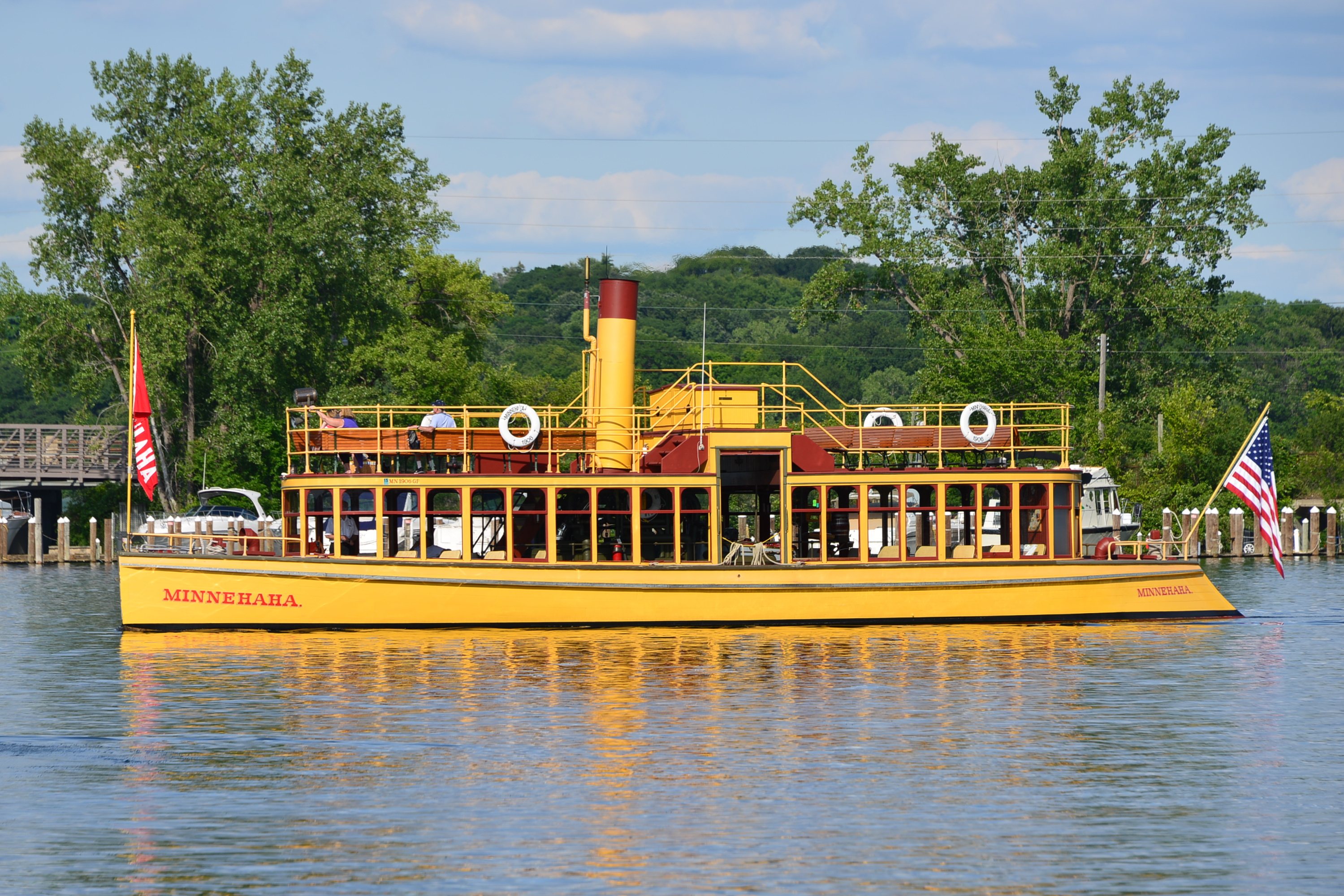
Minnehaha in 2014

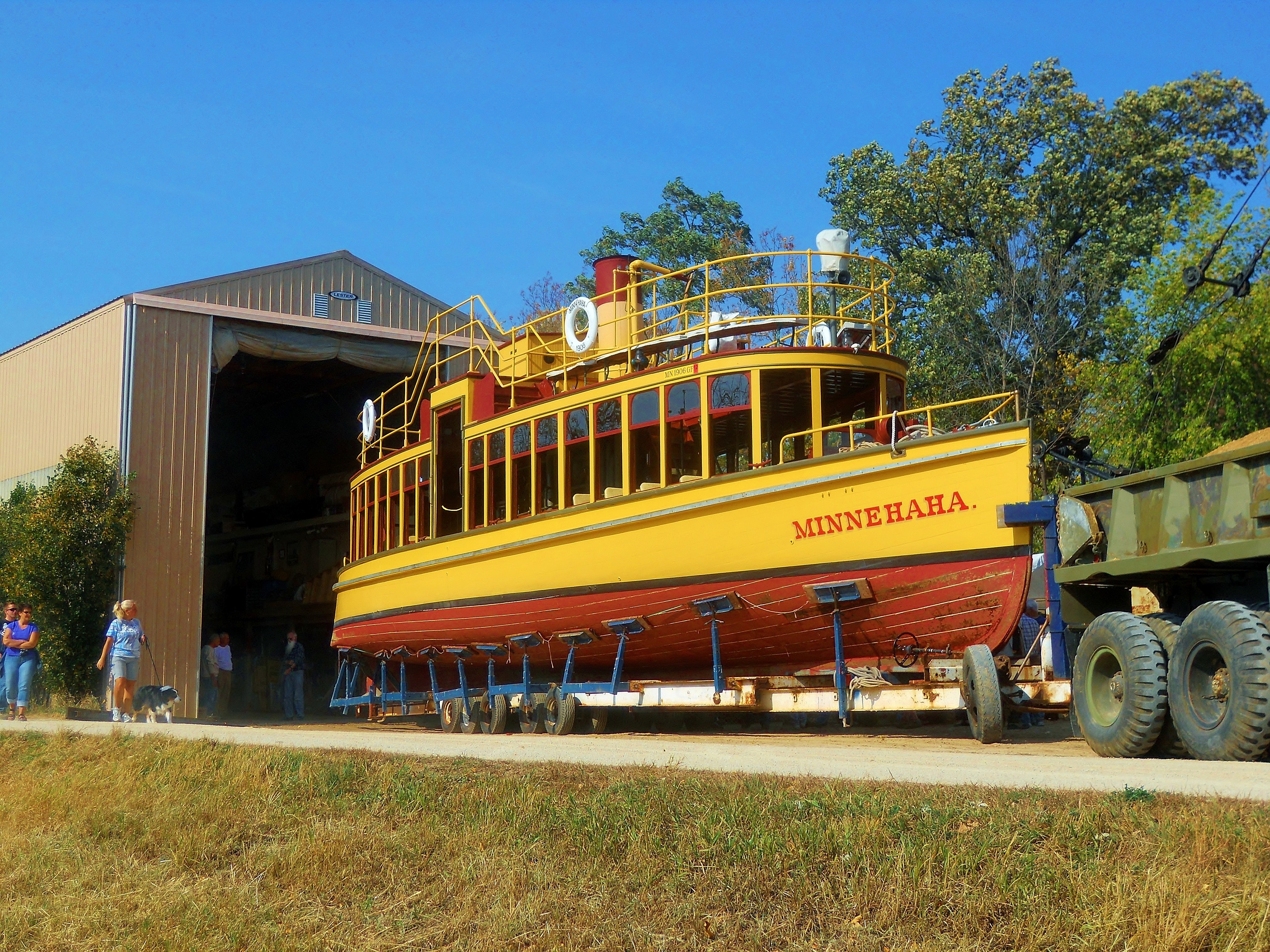
The restored Minnehaha in dry dock

== See also ==
- Lake Minnetonka
- Big Island Park
- Minnesota Streetcar Museum
