= Fred Ossanna =

American lawyer

Fred Albin Ossanna (August 13, 1893 – September 1978) was a Minnesota lawyer who, along with Kid Cann, oversaw the dismantling of the Minneapolis-St. Paul streetcar system as head of Twin City Rapid Transit Company in the 1950s. Ossanna had been hired by Charles Green, a Wall Street speculator who had purchased a large number of TCRT stock shares and ousted D.J. Strouse as head of the company soon after. When it was discovered that Green had connections to organized crime, Ossanna took control. In a period of 22 months ending in June 1954, rails were removed from city streets where trolleys once traveled to be replaced by General Motors buses.

Ossanna and associate Barney Larrick were both convicted of fraud on August 6, 1960 for activities that had taken place during the conversion from streetcars to buses. Specifically, Ossanna was convicted of six counts of mail fraud, two counts of wire fraud, three counts of fraudulent interstate shipment, and two counts of conspiracy. He was sentenced to two concurrent four-year terms in federal prison and fined $11,000.00. As a result he was disbarred from practicing as an attorney. Ossanna petitioned for reinstatement to the bar in 1970 and the Minnesota Supreme Court, holding he did not "prove by clear and satisfactory evidence" that he was rehabilitated, denied his petition.

Ossanna had been a prominent local attorney, and left marks in various places. He helped found the Sunset Memorial Park and Funeral Chapel in St. Paul, Minnesota in 1922 by providing funding. In 1938, he had acted as counsel in a debacle known as the "Bemidji Affair" where bidding irregularities had appeared on a project for the Bemidji State Teachers College (Bemidji State University). At some point, Ossanna had done some work for National City Lines, a company that became infamous for buying up streetcar lines and converting them to bus systems.
