= Big Island Park =

Former American amusement park

Coordinates: 44°56′1″N 93°33′21″W

Big Island Park (commonly referred to as Big Island Amusement Park) was a popular tourist destination that existed near Minneapolis, Minnesota between 1906 and 1911 on Lake Minnetonka's Big Island. Today the property is a municipal park owned by the City of Orono and is sometimes referred to as Big Island Nature Park to distinguish it from the former amusement park.

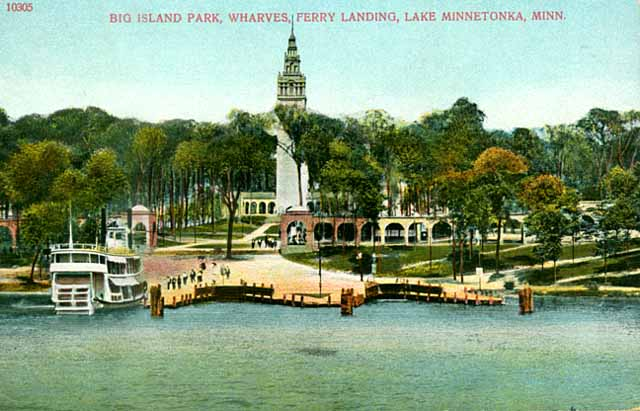
Big Island Park circa 1907

== History ==
=== Construction ===
The Twin Cities of Minneapolis-Saint Paul boasted one of the most extensive streetcar systems in the United States at the turn of the twentieth century. By 1905, lines reached the suburbs of Stillwater in the east and Excelsior in the west. The Twin City Rapid Transit Company (TCRT), which owned and operated the system, announced in 1905 that it had plans to construct a grand amusement park on 65 acres (26 hectares) of land that it had purchased on Lake Minnetonka's Big Island. The announcement was part of TCRT's master plan to attract tourists and excursionists to the edge of the system on summer weekends, when ridership was typically low. The company was already operating another amusement park called Wildwood near the eastern end of the system on White Bear Lake.

As Big Island Park was located on an island, TCRT built three 1,000-passenger ferry boats and a transfer terminal in the town of Excelsior to carry the visitors to and from mainland. Each of the ferries were 109 feet (33 m) long and were double-ended so they did not have to turn around after each crossing. TCRT also built six Express Boats that could provide limited service to Big Island Park in addition to serving commuters around Lake Minnetonka.

Big Island Park opened on August 5, 1906, with construction still underway.

=== Amenities ===
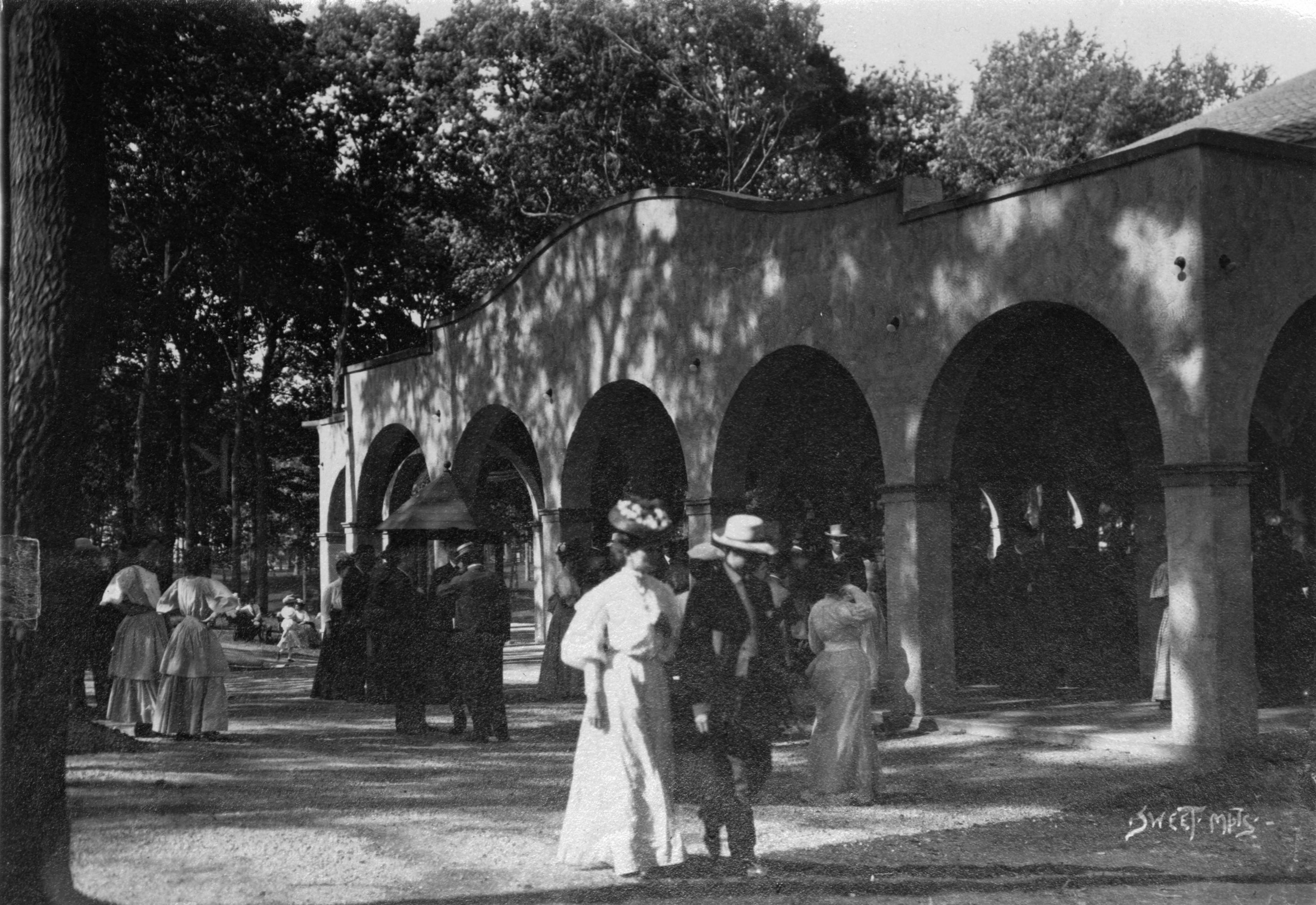
Entrance to music hall on Big Island.

TCRT commissioned LeRoy Buffington, a prominent local architect, to design Big Island Park's structures in the Mission Revival style of architecture. Many of the park's buildings, including a 186-foot (57 m) light beacon modeled after the Tower of Seville, were equipped with electric lights. The light cast from the top of the beacon could purportedly be spotted from downtown Minneapolis on a clear night, approximately 15 miles away.

A 1,500-seat music casino was completed in 1907 to serve as the park's premier entertainment center. Among the biggest acts to perform at the casino were the New York band and orchestra of Frederick Innes and the Banda Rossa Orchestra under the direction Eugenio Sorrentino. Most headliners, however, were local.

Other attractions at Big Island Park included a roller coaster, a carousel, boat rentals, a flume ride called the Old Mill, and another ride called the Scenic Ride Through Yellowstone Park. The park was also known for its picnic facilities, a popular activity at the time.

=== Closure ===
Due to excessive operating costs and lack of revenue during the off-season, TCRT closed Big Island Park in August 1911 and abandoned the property shortly thereafter. Most of the buildings and rides were dismantled over the winter of 1917–1918. Rebar within the structures was melted down and used for the World War I effort.

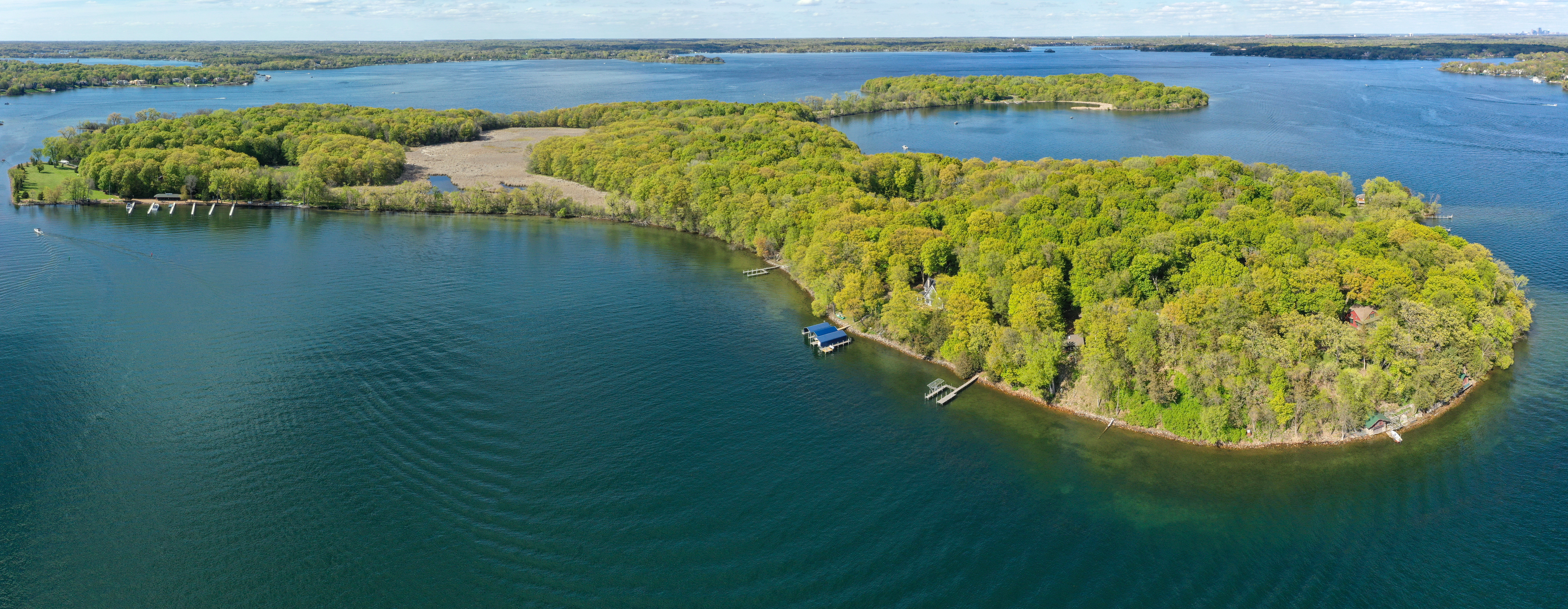
Big Island in 2021

After brief use as a state game farm, the property was eventually sold to several veterans associations and used as a campground for nearly 80 years. After the campground closed in 2003, the City of Orono purchased the property for $5.7 million and reopened it as a municipal park in 2006.

=== Big Island Park today ===
Few remnants of the original amusement park remain today. Several foundations, a ditch that once contained the Old Mill ride, and components of the grand entrance remain extant. Camping and alcohol are not allowed on the premises, but picnics, hiking, and other recreational activities are encouraged. A public dock is located at the site of the original steamboat wharf.

== See also ==
- Excelsior Amusement Park
- Coney Island of the West
- Minnehaha (steamboat)
- Minnesota Streetcar Museum
- Trolley park
