= Colonial Warehouse =

Building in Minneapolis

- U.S. Historic district – Contributing property
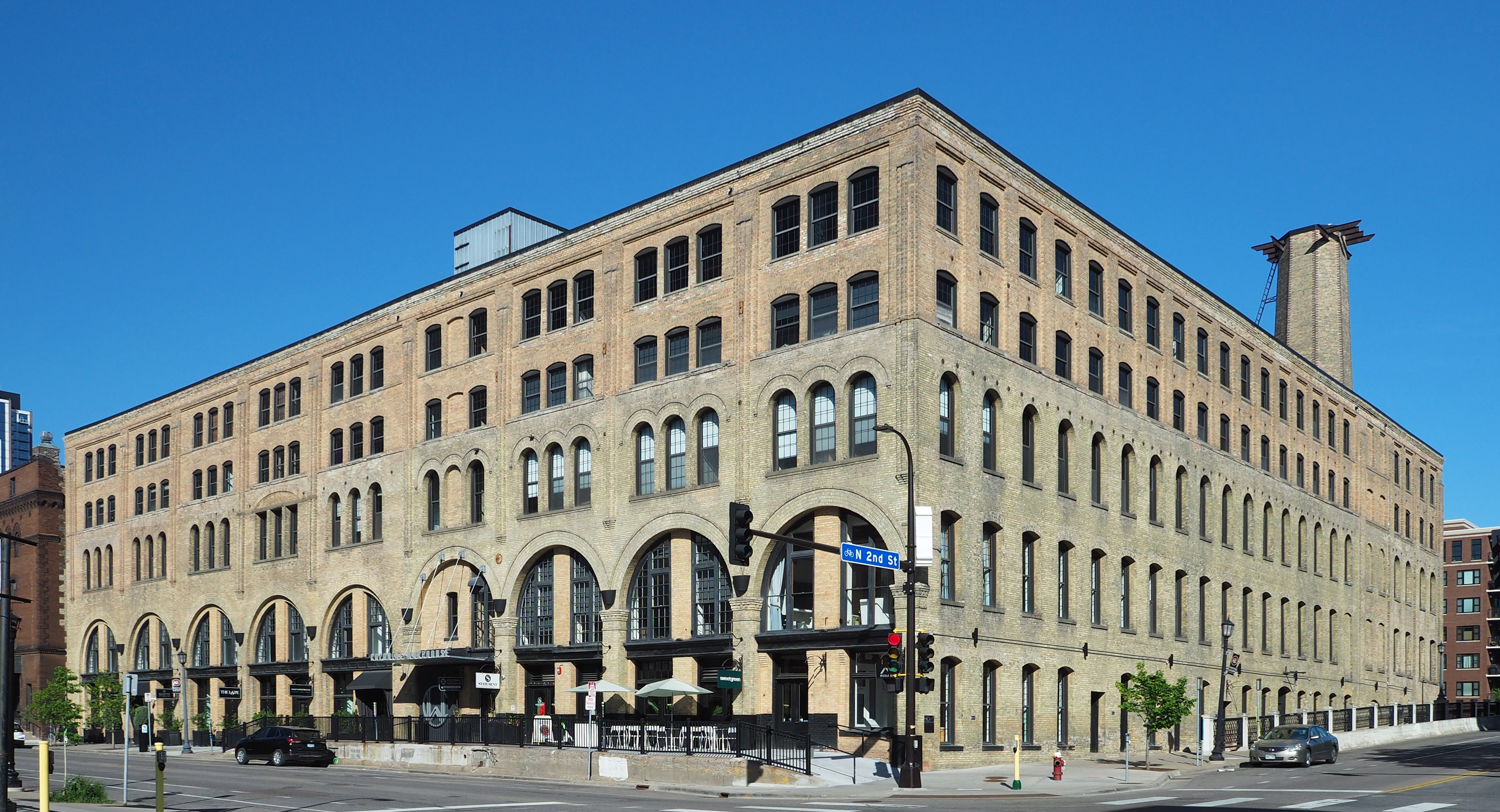
- The Colonial Warehouse viewed from the east

- Location within Minnesota Location within the United States
- Location: 212 N. 3rd Avenue, Minneapolis, Minnesota
- Coordinates: 44°59′7″N 93°16′19″W
- Built: 1885–1909
- Architect: Dunnell & Elliott
- Architectural style: Romanesque Revival
- Part of: Minneapolis Warehouse Historic District (ID69000369)
- Designated CP: November 3, 1989

Colonial Warehouse is a building in Minneapolis. It was built 1885–1909 as a series of buildings with a common façade. It is part of Minneapolis's historic Warehouse District and a contributing property to the Minneapolis Warehouse Historic District.

== History ==
Formally known as the Minneapolis Street Railway Company Building, the property now bears the name Colonial Warehouse. The warehouse was intended to be the powerhouse for a cable car system that was never built. Instead it became an electric carhouse, and the first electric powerhouse for streetcars in 1890. The building housed the general offices and the paint and woodworking shops during the horse-drawn streetcar era. Thomas Lowry, the head of the Minneapolis Street Railway Company, chose this site as the firm's headquarters. It became the main offices of the Minneapolis Street Railway Company until 1904.
