= Twin City Rapid Transit Company =

Twin City Rapid Transit
- Industry: Public transport
- Founded: 1875
- Defunct: 1970
- Fate: Streetcar system dismantled completely in 1954, sold in 1970
- Successor: Metro Transit
- Headquarters: Minneapolis-St. Paul
- Key people: Thomas Lowry, Horace Lowry, Charles Green, Fred Ossanna, Carl Pohlad
- Products: streetcars, horsecars, buses
- Number of employees: 1000 (estimated)
- Parent: Twin City Lines
- Subsidiaries: Minneapolis Street Railway Company, St. Paul City Railway Company, Minneapolis & St. Paul Suburban Railroad Company, Twin City Motor Bus Company, Minnetonka and White Bear Navigation Company, Rapid Transit Real Estate Corporation, Transit Supply Company

Twin City Rapid Transit

Operation
- Locale: Minneapolis-St. Paul
- Open: 1876
- Close: 1954, sold in 1970
- Status: defunct
- Owner: Twin City Rapid Transit
- Operator: Twin City Rapid Transit

Statistics
Horsecar & cable car era: ca 1876–ca 1890
- Status: Merged
- Owners: St. Paul Railway Company & Minneapolis Street Railway
- Track gauge: ?
- Minimum curve radius: ?
- Propulsion system: Horses
Electric streetcar era: ca 1890–1954 / Sold in 1970
- Status: Defunct
- Owner: Twin City Rapid Transit
- Operator: Twin City Rapid Transit
- Track gauge: 4 ft 8 1/2 in (1,435 mm) standard gauge
- Minimum curve radius: ?
- Electrification: Overhead lines
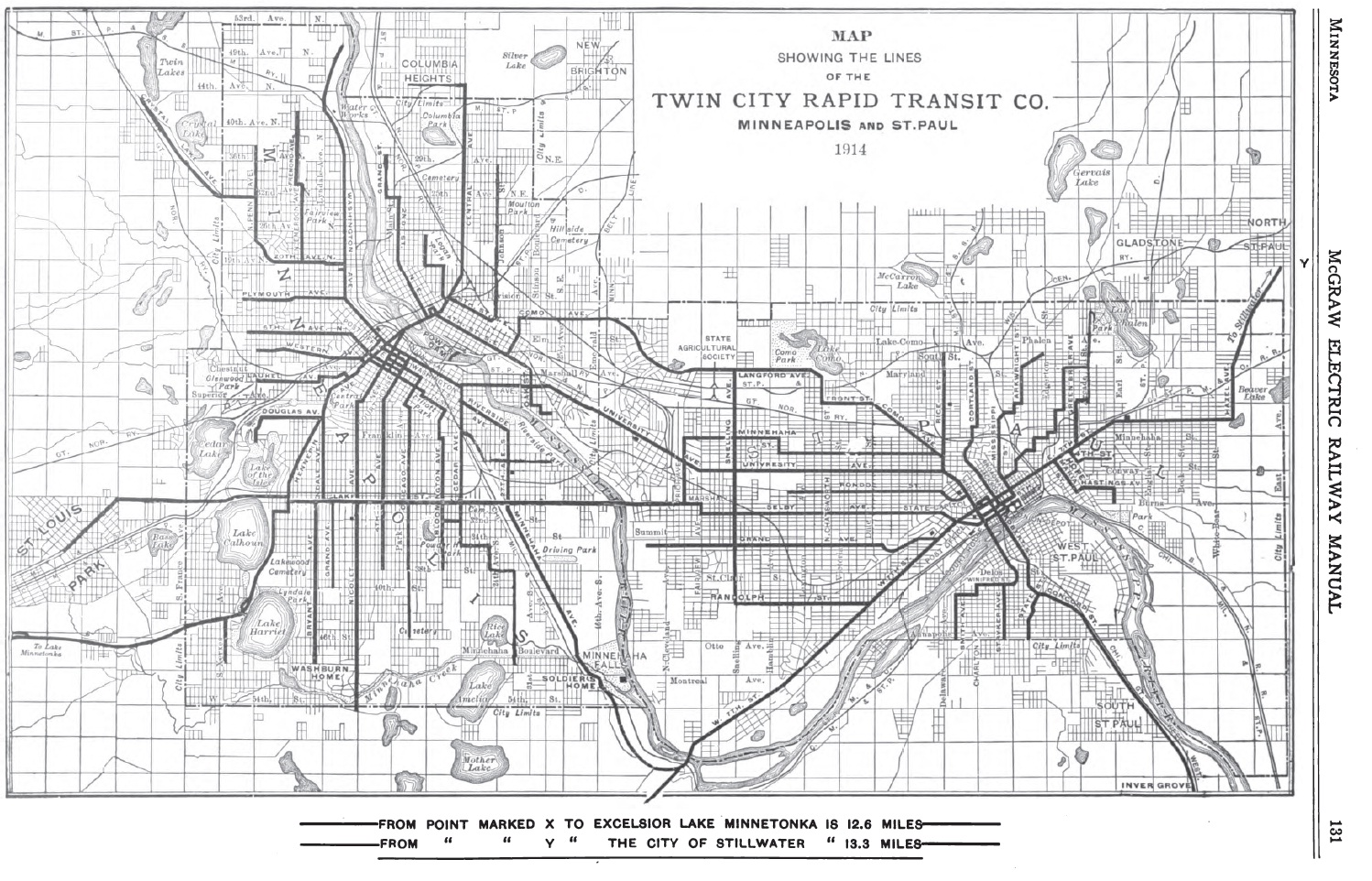
- Route map 1914

The Twin City Rapid Transit Company (TCRT), also known as Twin City Lines (TCL), was a transportation company that operated streetcars and buses in the Minneapolis-St. Paul metropolitan area in the U.S. state of Minnesota. Other types of transportation were tested including taxicabs and steamboats, along with the operation of some destination sites such as amusement parks. It existed under the TCRT name from a merger in the 1890s until it was purchased in 1962. At its height in the early 20th century, the company operated an intercity streetcar system that was believed to be one of the best in the United States. It is a predecessor of the current Metro Transit bus and light rail system that operates in the metro area.

== Establishment ==
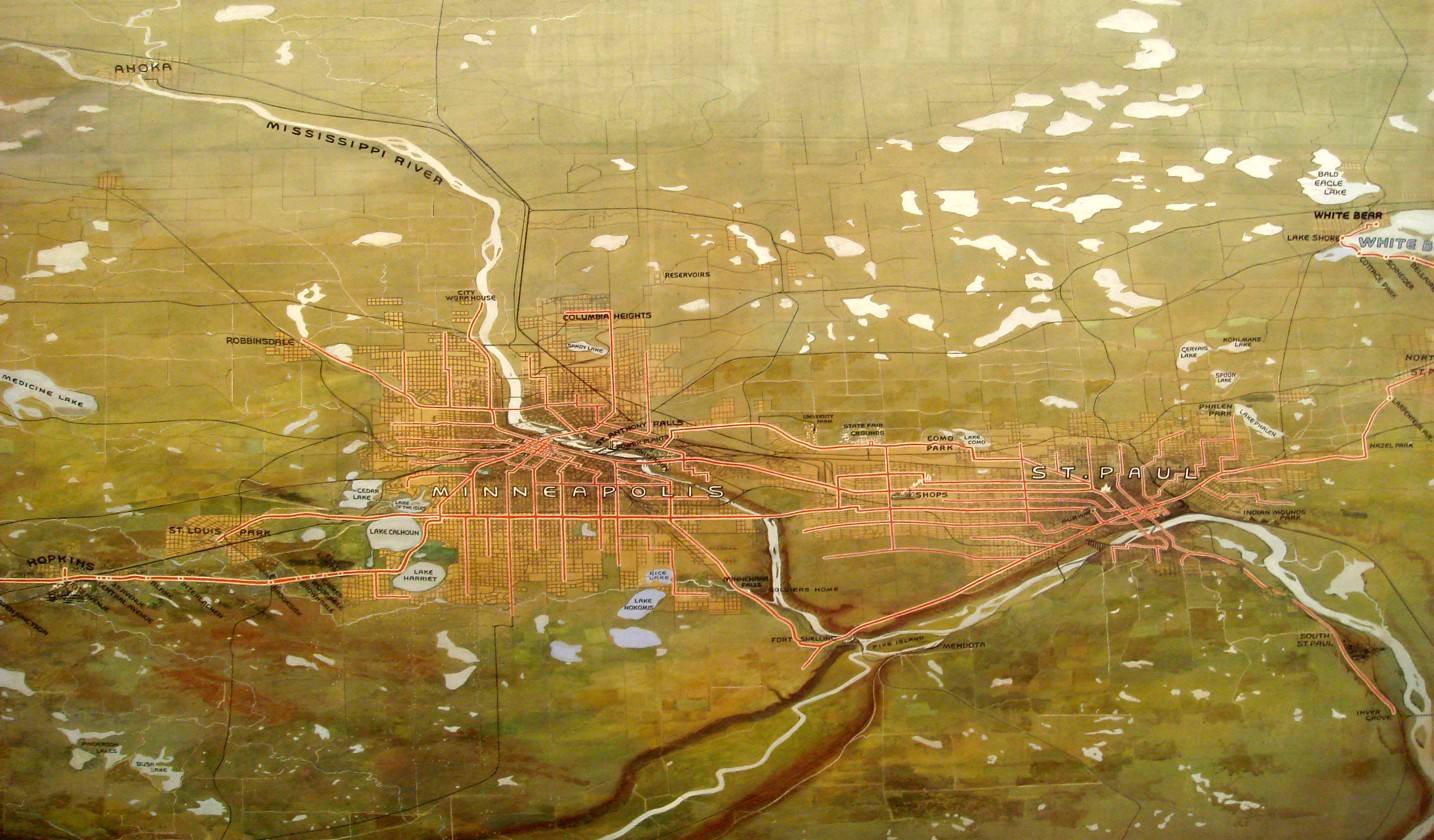
TCRT commissioned water-color painting of the streetcar system in the Twin Cities, originally completed in 1904; updated 1916.

The origins of street rail transport in the Twin Cities are not entirely known.It allegedly dates back to 1865, when businessman and mayor Dorilus Morrison began building rails in downtown Minneapolis. He quickly joined forces with Colonel William S. King and other Minneapolis businessmen to create the Minneapolis Street Railway. However, the lines didn't go very far and the railway was useless for a time. There are some indications that a streetcar was purchased but never used, collecting dust for several years.

On the other side of the Mississippi River, the St. Paul Railway Company started the first successful horse-drawn streetcar system of the metro area in St. Paul. Then in 1875, the reformed Minneapolis Street Railway made a deal with the Minneapolis City Council where the company would have exclusive access to street rails for 50 years if they could be up and operating in four months. The company recruited real-estate mogul Thomas Lowry, who on September 2, 1875, brought on line a route between downtown Minneapolis and the University of Minnesota.

The streetcars became popular because they rode on smooth rails, while most of the streets of the era were dirt or made of cobblestone pavers. These roads became treacherous to pedestrians and uncomfortable for horse-drawn vehicles, especially during Minnesota winters.

Thomas Lowry envisioned linking together the various railways that were cropping up around Minneapolis. While other systems were popping up with more horse-drawn carriages or cable cars, Lowry pushed forward with electrification of the lines. Starting in the late-1880s, electric streetcars began moving in both Minneapolis and St. Paul. Cable cars quickly lost favor as they struggled through snowy Minnesota winters and the public quickly grew weary of slow horsecars.

== Rise of the system ==
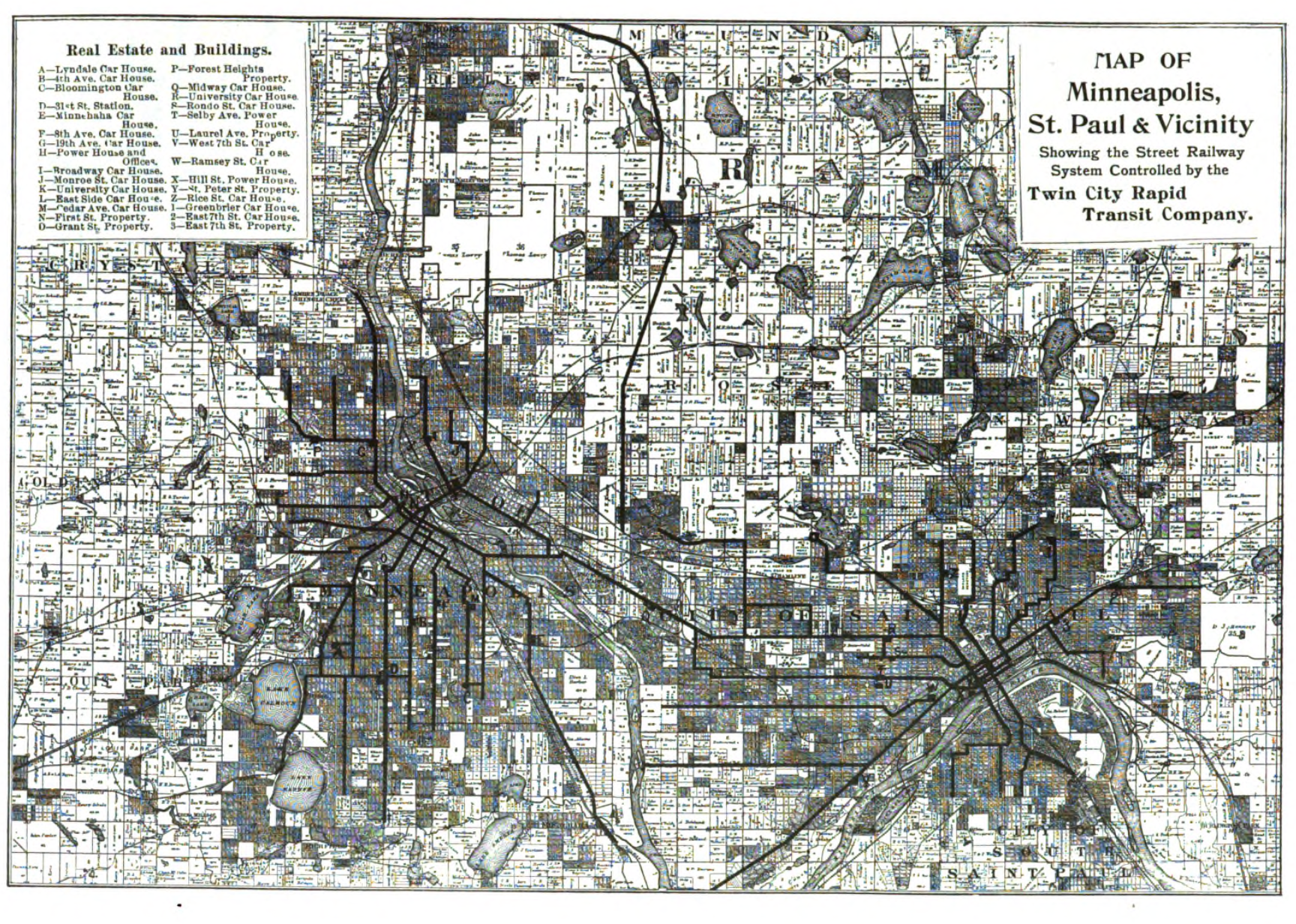
Minneapolis - St Paul Twin City Rapid Transit Company c 1894

In 1890, the two cities were connected with a railway along University Avenue, the first of four rail lines linking them together. A merger of the two city systems, the St. Paul City Railway Co. and Minneapolis Street Railway, formed the Twin City Rapid Transit Company. It went on a building spree, quickly doubling the amount of electrified track in the system.

The company continued absorbing smaller competitors for the next 40 years. In 1898, the company began a transition to using company-built streetcars and machinery (such as cranes and snowplows) rather than purchasing the cars from other companies. The first such car was built as a personal streetcar for company president Thomas Lowry, although his was a special-order. The car featured one end with large windows, to make the scenery more visible. This car was used on special occasions, such as the opening of new lines and a visit by United States President William McKinley.

TCRT built some of the largest streetcars in the country. The Twin City Rapid Transit Company got into the business of building street cars at its Nicollet Shops in 1898 after concluding that cars it was operating from Eastern manufactures couldn't hold up to Minnesota's harsh winters. By 1906 they opened a manufacturing facility at its Snelling Shops where they not only manufactured cars for TCRT but also Chattanooga, Duluth, Seattle and Chicago among others. These cars were larger than traditional streetcars, being 45 feet (13.72 m) long and 9 feet (2.74 m) wide.

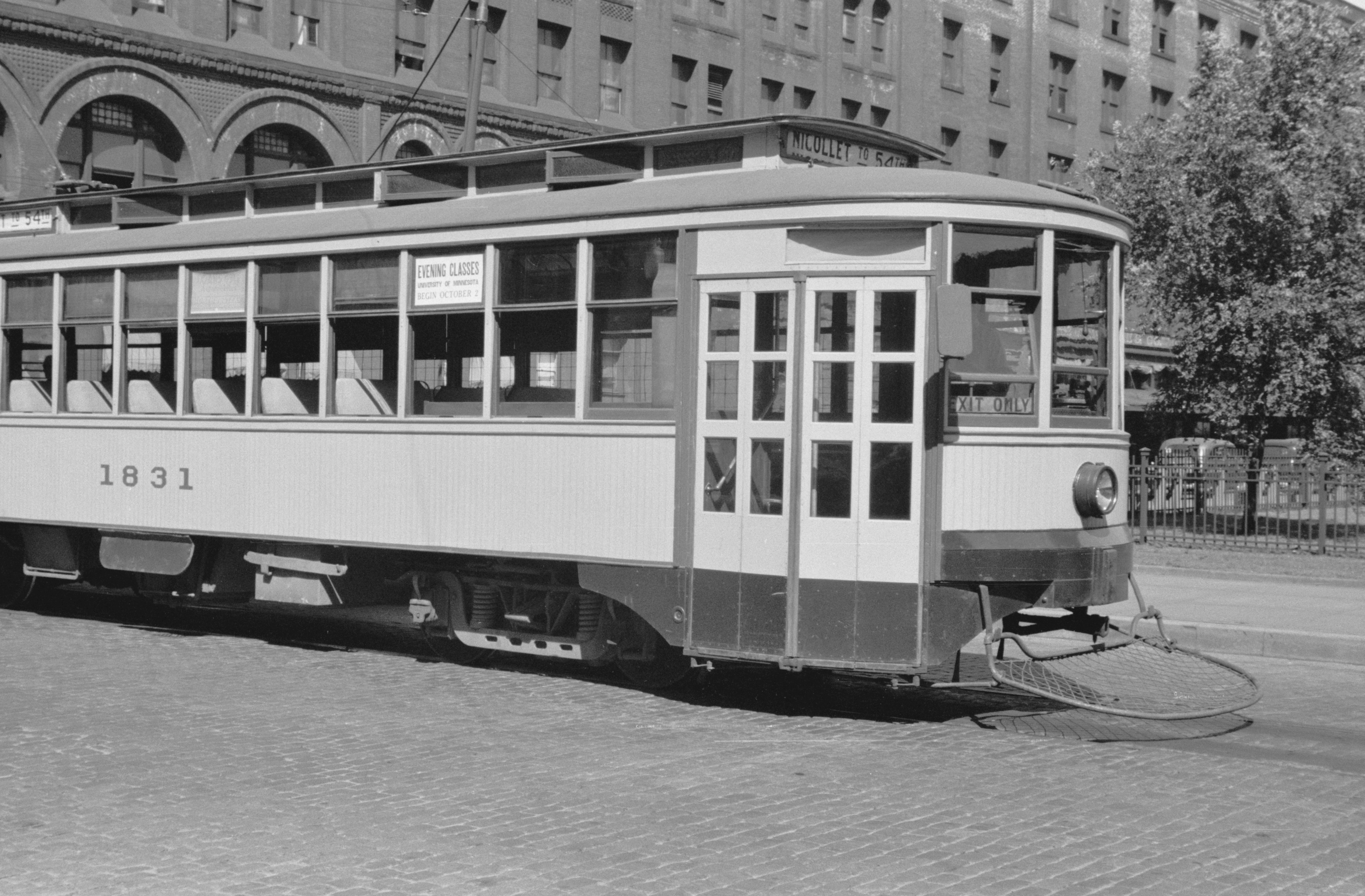
Streetcar in downtown Minneapolis, 1939.

Old track was also upgraded. In the early days, a number of lines had been laid down with narrow-gauge track. These were all upgraded to 4 ft 8 1/2 in (1,435 mm) (standard gauge). In addition, the basic construction of the lines improved. The rails of the Twin Cities were upgraded to the most expensive track in the country, running US$60,000 per mile. Tracks featured welded (thermite) joints, and were commonly surrounded by cobblestone or asphalt. By 1909, 95 percent of the rails were of this type of construction. They were used until the company ended streetcar service.

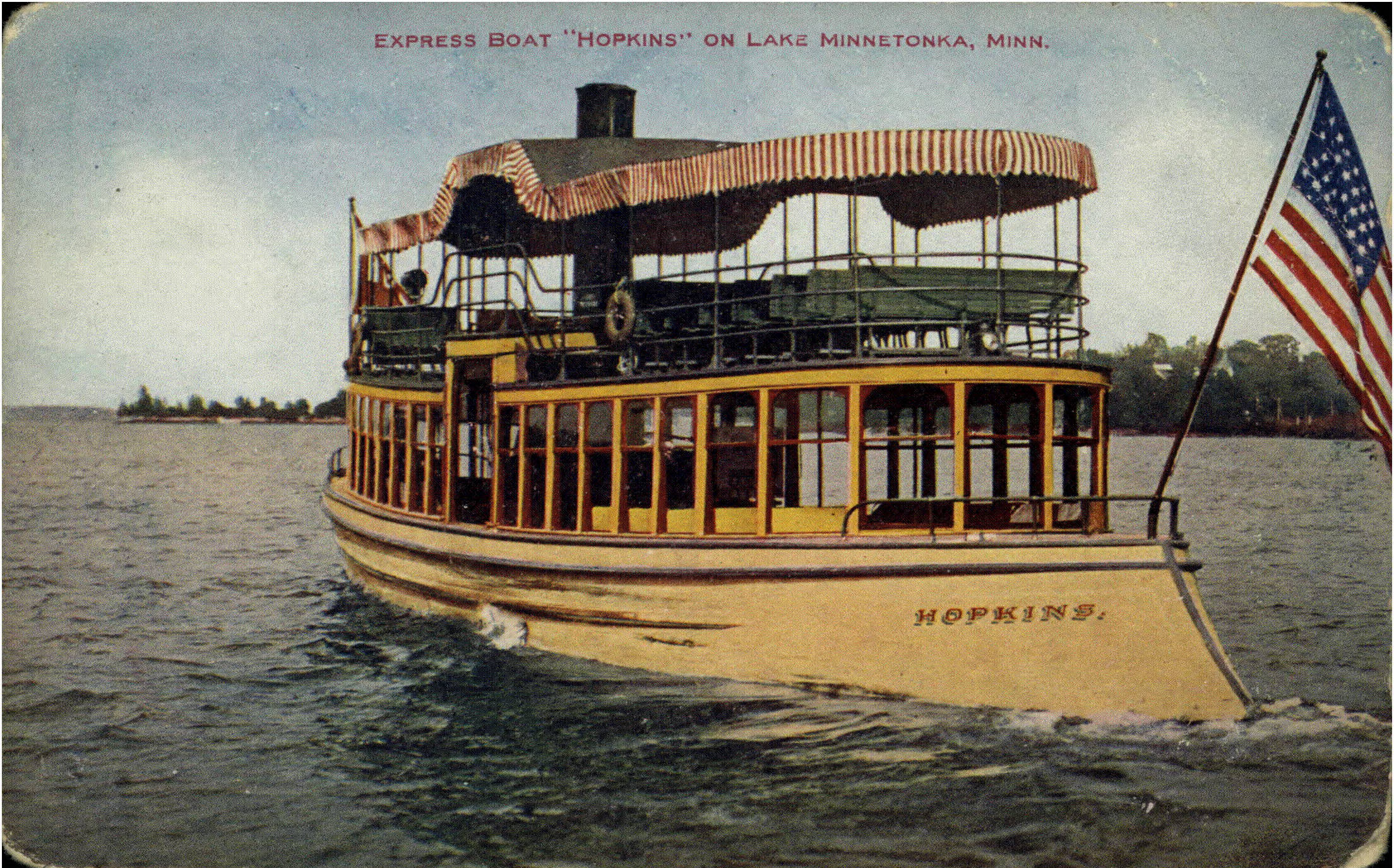
"Streetcar boat" Hopkins on Lake Minnetonka

From 1906 to 1926, TCRT experimented with "streetcar boats." Officially known as Express Boats, they were steam-powered vessels with designs reminiscent of the streetcars of the day. The boats operated between communities on Lake Minnetonka, but improved roads in that area hit ridership hard in the 1920s. Ultimately, seven were built, but most of them were scuttled in the lake in 1926.

TCRT also expanded into the suburban amusement park business by opening the Wildwood Amusement Park on White Bear Lake and Big Island Park on Lake Minnetonka. The park on Big Island was serviced by three large ferry boats from Excelsior.

As the rise of the internal combustion engine in transportation grew, the Twin City Rapid Transit acquired several bus lines that began to pop up around the time of World War I. They also acquired a taxicab company in the 1920s.

When the transportation system peaked in 1922, it had nearly 530 miles (850 km) of track and 1021 streetcars. Rail extended a distance of about 50 miles (80 km) from Stillwater on the bank of the St. Croix River in the east to Lake Minnetonka in the west. For a time, TCRT was the largest employer in the area.

It is rumored that anyone who lived in Minneapolis was no farther than 400 yards (370 m) (less than 1/4 mile or 0.40 kilometers) from the nearest station at that time.

== Changing labor conditions ==
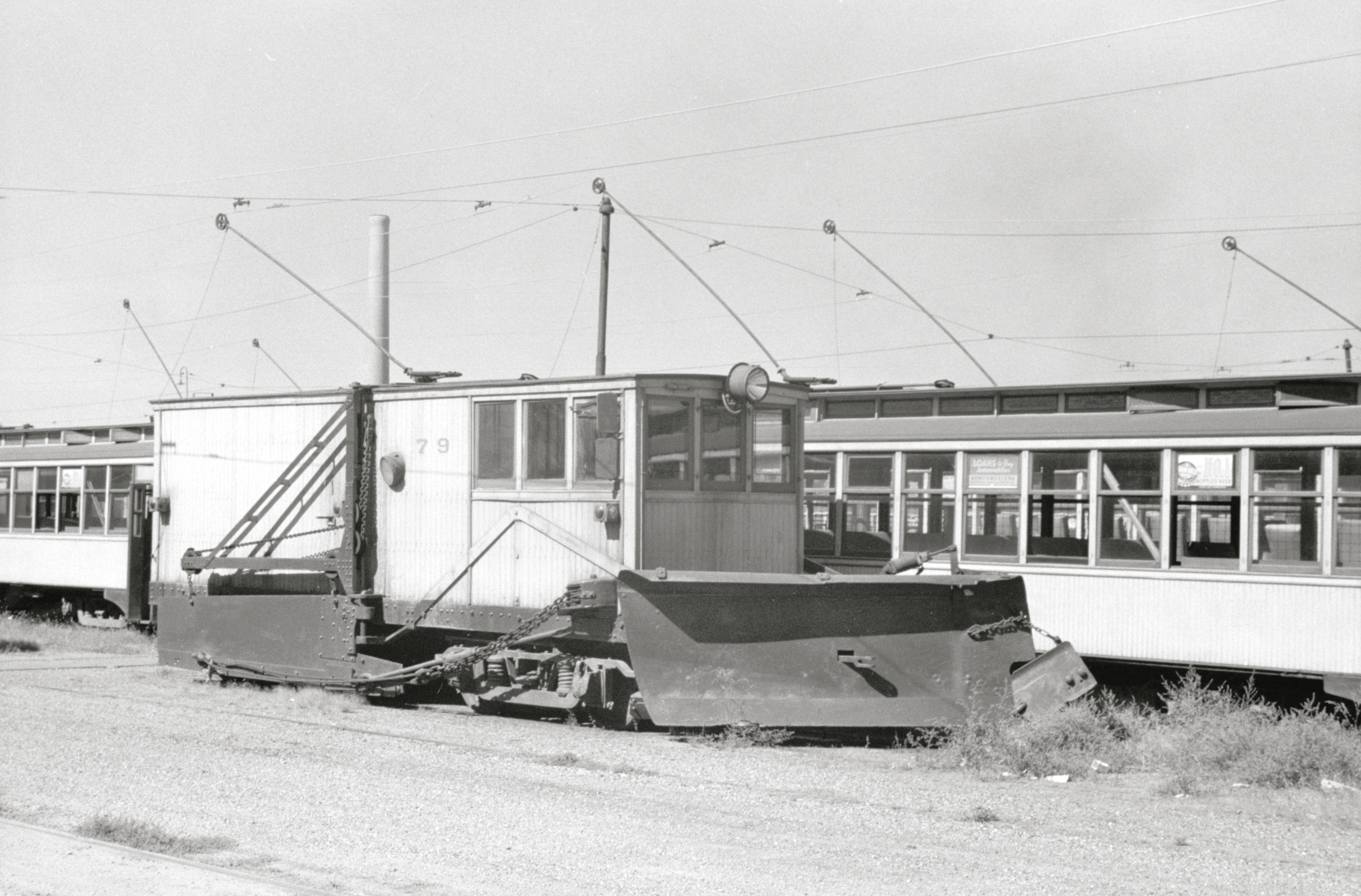
Snowplow streetcar, 1939.

In 1917, a major labor strike took place in the months after the United States entered World War I. It began on October 6, and was influenced by the organization Industrial Workers of the World (IWW, also known as the "Wobblies"), a group that had been organizing unions in the region, particularly in the northern Mesabi Iron Range. Horace Lowry, son of Thomas Lowry, headed the company at this time and absolutely refused to negotiate with the striking workers. This angered workers and others who felt sympathy for them.

Angry strikers in St. Paul damaged streetcars and harassed those who had continued to work. The Minnesota Commission of Public Safety ordered the workers back on the job and they complied for a while. People again left work in late-November. On December 2, a crowd energized by speakers from the Nonpartisan League again grew angry after TCRT cut off electricity to the streetcars in downtown St. Paul, making it impossible for many people to return home. Over the following days, many were arrested and the strike was effectively broken. 800 people were eventually replaced by non-union workers.

Things turned out differently in the 1930s, although it was not a smooth transition. In 1932, most of the system's streetcars were converted to "one-man operation" where, rather than requiring both a motorman to drive in front and a conductor to take fares in the rear, the motorman took over both operations. The doors on the streetcars were modified to allow easier boarding in front. So-called "gate cars" which had used open grating on the rear of the cars mostly disappeared from the lines. The transition from two-man to one-man operation was taking place on many streetcar lines across the country around this time.

The conversion to single-man operation meant that about half of the company's workforce was suddenly surplus. Many employees found it hard to get work and were often forced to take strange shifts. One worker recorded having a 17-hour shift from 4:24 p.m. on Sunday to 9:49 a.m. on Monday. There was a company union, although it hadn't done much good. By October 1933, the workers had gained backing from Minnesota Governor Floyd B. Olson, St. Paul Mayor William Mahoney and the National Recovery Administration, among others. The next year, the workers voted to join the Amalgamated Transit Union.

== Competition from automobiles ==
With the Great Depression and the rise of the automobile, the rail lines began to decline. Buses were frequently used toward the edges of the system as long routes, especially those with low ridership, were cut back. World War II allowed the system to bounce back for a time, since strict fuel rationing and citizens' efforts to conserve resources made automobile use rather un-patriotic. However, the restrictions also hit TCRT itself since they could not afford to build many new streetcars. The company was forced to add more buses to shore up the system's various routes.

After the war, trolley riders returned to their automobiles. TCRT's management explored ways to upgrade the line to bring people back. Heavy wartime use meant that the rails needed to be repaired. Competition from other forms of transportation required modernization. In 1945, the company received its first streamlined PCC streetcar. The following years saw dozens of new PCC cars on the streets, although the first one remained unique in the fleet because it was the only one to have air brakes. All of the PCCs were several inches wider than standard, to match the nine-foot (2.74 m) width of the company's older streetcars.

== Company takeover and decline ==
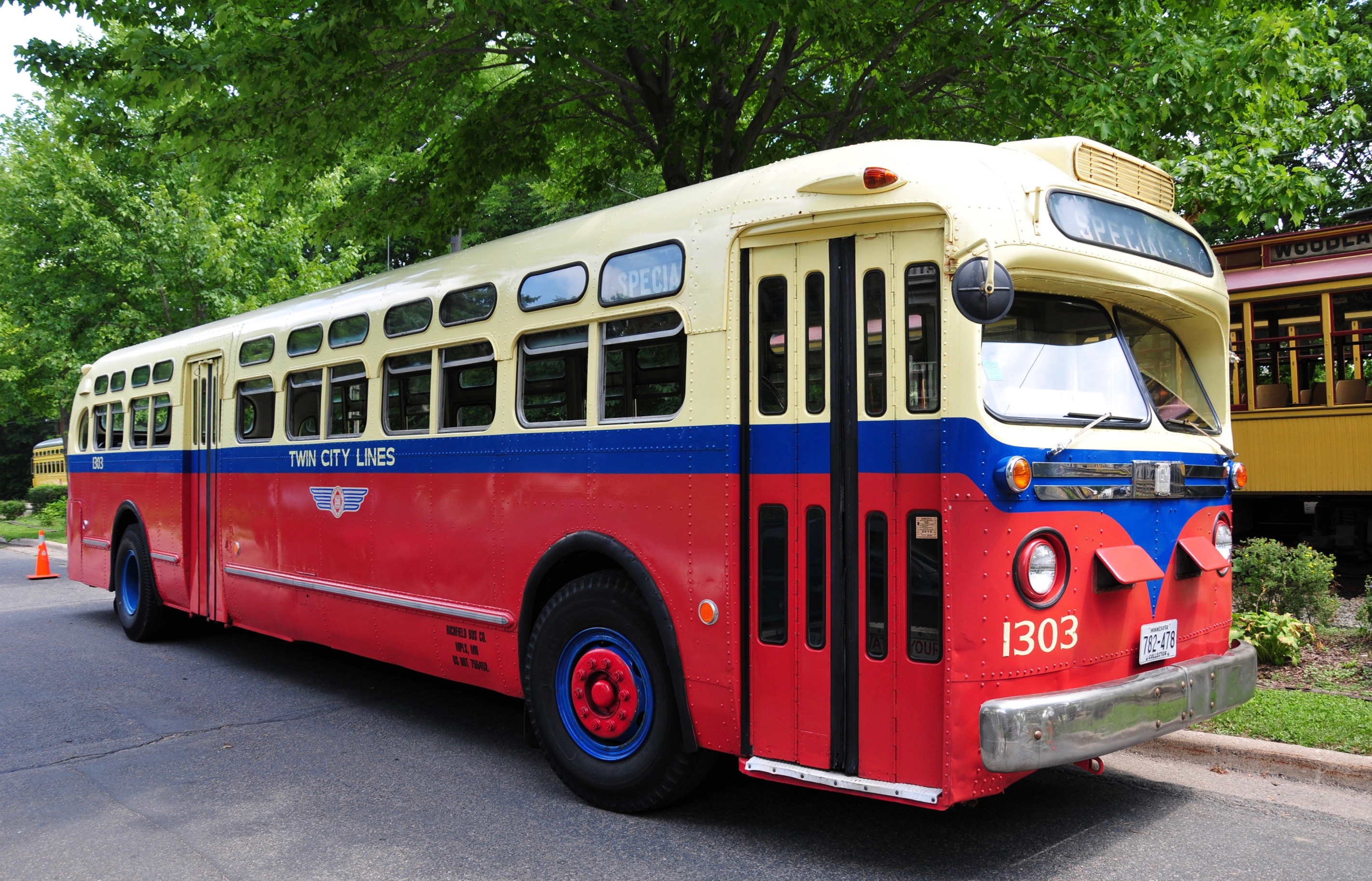
A 1954-built Twin City Lines bus, now preserved, in 2011

The company had a long-standing policy of reinvestment in the rail system. When profits appeared, they were usually used to pay off loans and improve the rails, streetcars and other hardware the company owned. It was rare for the company to pay out dividends. In 1948, Wall Street speculator Charles Green bought 6000 shares of TCRT stock. He expected to quickly gain profit, but found he had purchased stock just as the company decided to set forth on some major construction. Knowing this would demolish his anticipated dividends, Green contacted other shareholders and urged them to vote out the company's president, D. J. Strouse and put him in charge instead.

Green took control of the company in 1949 and quickly started dismantling the railway system, announcing that the company would completely switch to buses by 1958. The system's PCCs were sold to Mexico City (91), Newark NJ (30) and Shaker Heights OH (20). Green sold his shares in 1950 to be briefly replaced by Emil B. Anderson before local lawyer Fred Ossanna ascended to head the company the next year. Ossanna held off on the teardown for a short while, but soon announced that the process would be accelerated. Lines would be removed and replaced by buses in two years.

== End of the streetcar system ==
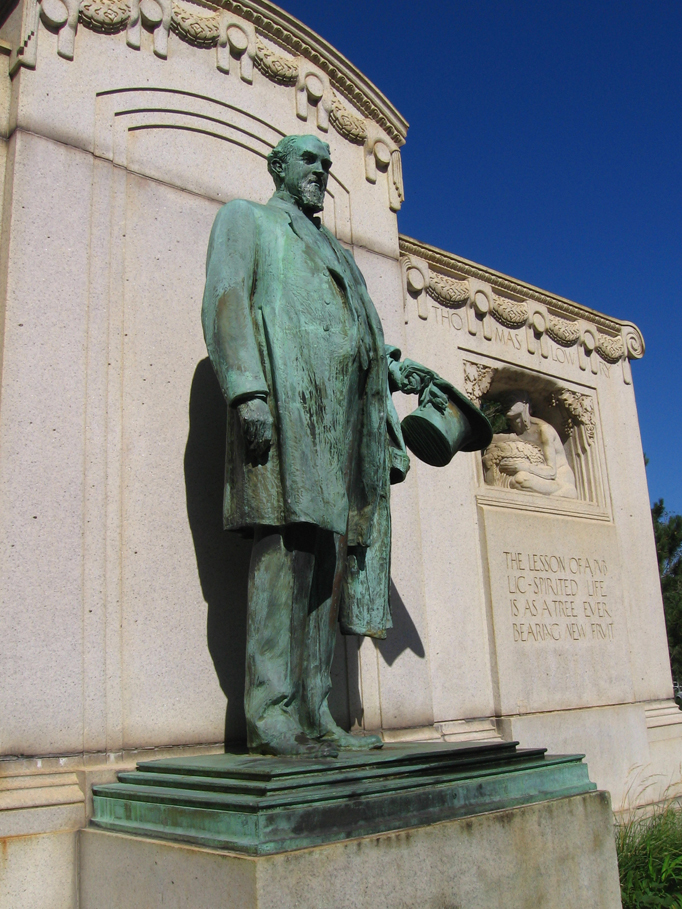
Closeup view of the Thomas Lowry Memorial statue in Smith Triangle Park at the intersection of Hennepin Avenue, Emerson Avenue, and 24th Street in Minneapolis, Minnesota. The inscription reads: "The lesson of a public-spirited life is as a tree ever bearing new fruit." Lowry died in 1909.

On June 19, 1954, four years before Green had envisioned, the very last streetcars ran in Minneapolis. The leftover vehicles were burned to recover the scrap metal they contained. The last streetcar was famously photographed alight behind Fred Ossanna and James Towley as Towley presented Ossanna with a check.

At the time there were a range of issues facing TCRT. Highway development enabled settlement over a wider area. Minneapolis' population peaked in the late 1940s and St. Paul's a decade later in the late 1950s. Population growth and job growth was spread out in less dense suburbs where capital requirements for building new rail were too high compared to the potential ridership. Building rails to service these areas was cost prohibitive. Buses though could be profitable on such routes. More so other streetcar lines without connection to NCL also converted to buses, frequently having done so long before the TCRT began the process.

Fred Ossanna came to work at TCRT as a lawyer for Charles Green in the 1949 takeover of the company. Reportedly, Ossanna planned to order 25 buses from General Motors and was instead offered 525. The vast majority of buses in TCRT's eventual bus fleet were built by GM.

Most of the activity was geared toward stripping TCRT of its assets to fill the pockets of owners and investors. Ossanna was convicted in 1960 of illegally taking personal profit from the company during the transition period. He was imprisoned along with other accomplices. Carl Pohlad, who became the owner of the Minnesota Twins in 1984, was the eventual successor of Fred Ossanna as head of Twin City Lines in the 1960s. He ultimately sold the company in 1970.

== Streetcar preservation ==
Before the dismantling began, TCRT had purchased a significant number of PCC streetcars. These were sold off in 1952 and 1953, still in very good operating condition. The cars ended up in Mexico City (91 cars), Newark, New Jersey (30) and Shaker Heights, Ohio (20). Relatively few places could have taken them because of their extra width and each of these buyers had significant amounts of dedicated right-of-way. For instance, the Shaker Heights Rapid Transit commuter line in Cleveland was grade-separated in many areas. The vast majority of the older wooden streetcars, mostly built by TCRT itself, were destroyed. Out of 1240 built by the company, only five have survived to be restored and operated by rail museums.

Only two of the wooden streetcars in use in the 1950s had been given away to railfan groups before the rest of the fleet was burned. They are owned by the Minnesota Streetcar Museum (TCRT No. 1300) and the Seashore Trolley Museum (TCRT No. 1267) in Maine. One other steel-sheathed car (TCRT No. 1583) had been sent to a railway to the north in Duluth-Superior, but it was never used. It now resides at the East Troy Electric Railroad Museum in Wisconsin. A few additional cars escaped the burn pits, but they were still subjected to harsh conditions and only two are restored.

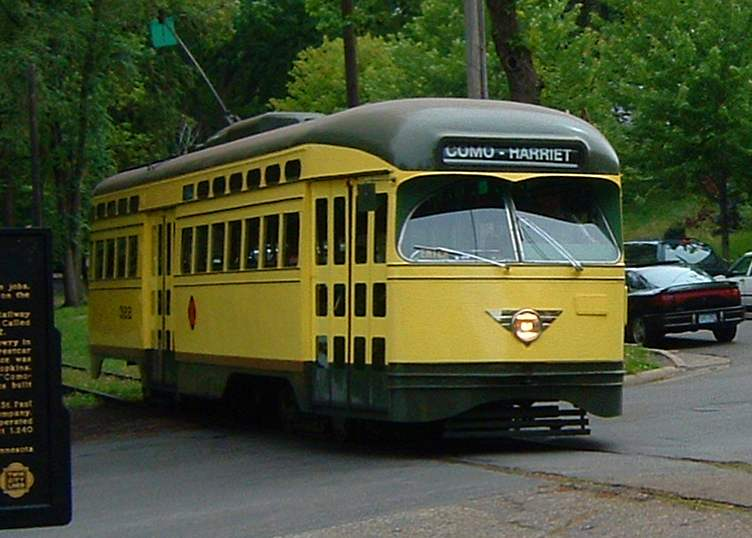
TCRT PCC Streetcar Number 322 is now owned by the Minnesota Streetcar Museum and is pictured here riding near Lake Harriet on the museum's route.

One of the streetcar boats, the Minnehaha, was found by divers and then brought to the surface in 1980. After a long wait, it was restored and has been operating on Lake Minnetonka from 1996 to 2004 by the Minnesota Transportation Museum and since then by the Museum of Lake Minnetonka. MTM also restored one of TCRT's old PCC cars (TCRT No. 322), operated now by the Minnesota Streetcar Museum.

A number of PCC cars once owned by Twin City Rapid Transit are just beginning their lives as museum pieces. The Newark City Subway finished operation of their 24 remaining cars on August 24, 2001, replacing the cars with new light-rail trainsets. Fifteen have been sold to the San Francisco Municipal Railway (Muni), for their collection of classic streetcars on the Market Street Railway. In addition, 12 PCCs that ran on the Shaker Heights line are now owned by the Brooklyn Historic Railway Association. Many of these cars owe their longevity to the fact that the Twin Cities area makes heavy use of salt to de-ice roadways in the winter. In anticipation of this, the cars were largely made of stainless steel to prevent corrosion.

== Historical remnants ==
Other vestiges of the company's streetcar history remained in the Twin Cities, and some surviving elements are now listed on the National Register of Historic Places. One of the oldest structures to survive is a building in Minneapolis now known as the Colonial Warehouse. First built in 1885, it housed the headquarters of the Minneapolis Street Railway Co. during the early horsecar era and also later served as a powerhouse as the system was converted. The lines needed a lot of electricity, so hydroelectric generators were installed at Saint Anthony Falls about a mile away and the Southeast Steam Plant was also constructed nearby. The old headquarters was sold in 1908, soon after these were constructed. The steam plant was bought by the University of Minnesota, which now uses it for providing heat to the campus downriver.

A large building on Snelling Avenue in St. Paul first served as the main construction and repair shop for the streetcars when it was built in 1907. It was expanded and remodeled over the years, later becoming a major garage for the bus system. However, the complex became outdated, with poor ventilation, a leaky roof and other problems. It was finally shut down and demolished in September 2001. Allianz Field and the surrounding development now occupy the land.

Selby Hill in St. Paul was a steep climb and was a place where cable cars were used in the late 19th century before Selby Hill Tunnel was constructed in 1905 to provide a more gradual incline. The tunnel still exists, but the ends have been blocked off, and as of July 2022 has largely become a homeless encampment. It is near the Cathedral of St. Paul.

Billboards across the area were originally laid out to target passengers of the rail lines with advertising. Many of these billboards remained for decades afterward, despite the fact that automobile traffic frequently favored different routes. These finally disappeared due to city beautification efforts in the 1990s.

== Legacy to 21st century rail ==
In the 1970s, the bus lines (some of which still trace former horse-drawn carriage paths) were shifted to a partially publicly funded operation overseen by the Metropolitan Council. All regional transportation for the metropolitan area was soon overseen by the Met Council's transit agency which would take on the name Metro Transit. Twenty years after rails disappeared from Twin Cities streets, politicians and planners began proposing new light rail systems. Congestion was bad enough in 1972 that there were proposals to build new subways or people movers, but excessively high costs prevented any of the projects from getting anywhere until the end of the century. The University of Minnesota did a fair amount of research on personal rapid transit (PRT) systems and has held a number of patents on the idea.

Rail transport returned to the Twin Cities with the construction of the Blue Line, which began operations in 2004. A proposal for a heritage streetcar line running east–west through the city, possibly including PCC cars once owned by TCRT, has been examined. A Northstar commuter rail line, tracing U.S. Highway 10 northwest out of Minneapolis, opened in 2009, but was replaced with bus service in January 2026 following ridership decline. A connection between both of the twin cities, called the Green Line, opened on June 14, 2014. Light rail west from Minneapolis to the southwest suburbs is being constructed as of 2020. Other proposals have included adding both a commuter connection to the complete North and Southeast of downtown Saint Paul. A light rail alignment to the Southwest of downtown Saint Paul has been previously discussed, but dismissed due to the expectation of low ridership.

== See also ==
- General Motors streetcar conspiracy
- Light rail in Minnesota
- Minnesota Streetcar Museum
