= Plug-in electric vehicles in Minnesota =

As of February 2021, there were about 19,000 electric vehicles in Minnesota, equivalent to about 0.25% of cars in the state. As of May 2022, about 3% of all new vehicle sales were electric.

== Government policy ==
In 2021, Republicans in the state legislature proposed a bill that would tax electricity used to charge electric vehicles at public charging stations, in order to offset the lack of gasoline taxes collected from them.

As of 2020, there were 37 electric vehicles and 116 plug-in hybrid vehicles in the state fleet.

== Charging stations ==
As of June 2021, there were about 1,200 public charging stations in Minnesota. As of August 2022, there were 55 public DC charging stations.

The Infrastructure Investment and Jobs Act, signed into law in November 2021, allocates US$68 million for charging stations in Minnesota.

== Economic impact ==
There have been concerns about negative economic impacts from EV-induced loss of demand for biofuels, which comprise a large portion of agriculture in Minnesota.

== By region ==
=== Minneapolis–Saint Paul ===
As of April 2022, 2.7% of all new vehicles registered in the Minneapolis–Saint Paul metropolitan area were electric.

In February 2022, the cities of Minneapolis and Saint Paul launched Evie Carshare, the largest public electric vehicle car-sharing program in the United States.

=== Rochester ===
The first electric bus in the fleet of Rochester Public Transit was introduced in July 2022.
