= Dakota Rail Regional Trail =

Trail on former railway in Minnesota

Coordinates: 44°54′24.5″N 93°44′11.5″W

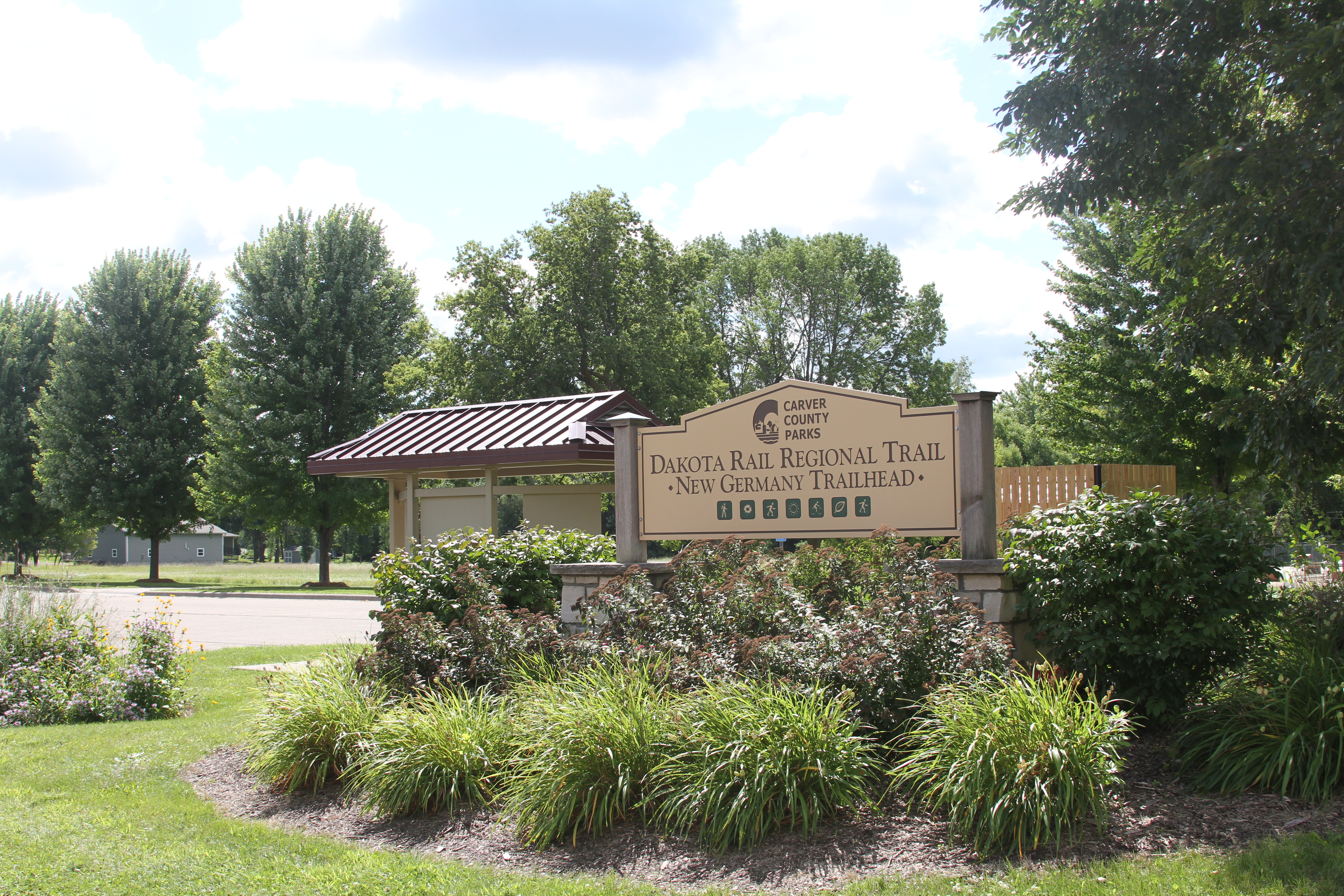
- Length: 28.1 mi (45.2 km)
- Location: Minnesota, United States
- Established: 2001
- Trailheads: Lester Prairie (west); Wayzata (east)
- Use: Cycling, Pedestrians
- Elevation gain/loss: 272 feet (80 m); 279 feet (90 m)
- Highest point: 1,001 ft (305 m)
- Lowest point: 932 ft (284 m)
- Grade: Mostly flat
- Difficulty: Easy
- Season: Year-round
- Sights: Lake Minnetonka; Gale Woods Farm
- Surface: Concrete and asphalt
- Website: https://www.threeriversparks.org/location/dakota-rail-regional-trail

The Dakota Rail Trail runs 28.1 miles (42.6 km) from Wayzata to Lester Prairie, Minnesota. It is on part of the former track bed of the Hutchinson Spur of the Great Northern Railway. The railway line helped bring wheat and raw materials from Central Minnesota to the flour mills, factories and warehouses in Minneapolis from 1885 until 2001. The railway line, from which there are views of the countryside, was also designed to bring tourists to the communities on Lake Minnetonka in the late 1880s.

The rail trail heads west from Wayzata. The first 13 miles are in Hennepin County, Minnesota, and the next 13.5 miles are in Carver County, Minnesota. Along the way it runs through many towns, including Spring Park and St. Bonifacius.

== History ==
The line was charted 1885 by James J Hill, and the St. Paul and Pacific Railway, later Great Northern Railway. It was known as the "Hutch Spur".

Great Northern merged with Northern Pacific Railway, which formed Burlington Northern Railroad. Burlington Northern sold the line to Dakota Rail in 1985, where it operated both freight and dinner trains.

In 1995, RailAmerica purchased Dakota Rail. The last train left Hutchinson in 2001, when the line was abandoned. It was bought up by Hennepin County Regional Railroad Authority, Carver County and McLeod County.

Despite being more than a decade since the rail line was officially abandoned, there are still remnants of the past railroad use, including an engine house in Spring Park, various trestles, a rail spur in Mound, a rail spur at a scrapyard in Hutchinson, and a dead-end track from the Wayzata Subdivision jutting to the west and ending at the beginning of the Dakota Rail Trail.

== McLeod County ==
As of early 2020, the trail only exists as an approximately 1 mile (1.6 km) stub from Lester Prairie. It starts at Central Avenue and travels east to the Carver County line.

== Carver County ==
The trail is maintained by the Carver County Parks Department. It runs for 12.5 miles (20.1 km).

=== Route ===
The trail starts at McLeod County line and travels east. It enters the small town of New Germany and crosses County Road 33. It parallels County Road 30 on its way to Mayer. It crosses MN 25 and continues east. It passes south of Goose Lake, and under a bridge under County Road 10. The trail lines the north shore of Lake Waconia, and passes over the Lake Waconia Trestle. It turns northeastward and crosses the Hennepin County line.

=== History ===
In early 2010, Carver County began construction of the section from St. Bonifacius to Mayer. The first trail section runs 7 miles (11 km). It officially opened on May 21, 2011.

Carver County extended the trail in 2012 from Mayer, west through New Germany to the Carver/McLeod County Line. The second section runs for 5.5 miles (8.9 km).

The former railroad property runs west to Hutchinson MN, but plans are not known at this time for the future trail development west of Carver County.

== Hennepin County ==
=== Route ===
The trail is maintained by the Three Rivers Park District. it is 14 miles (23 km) long.

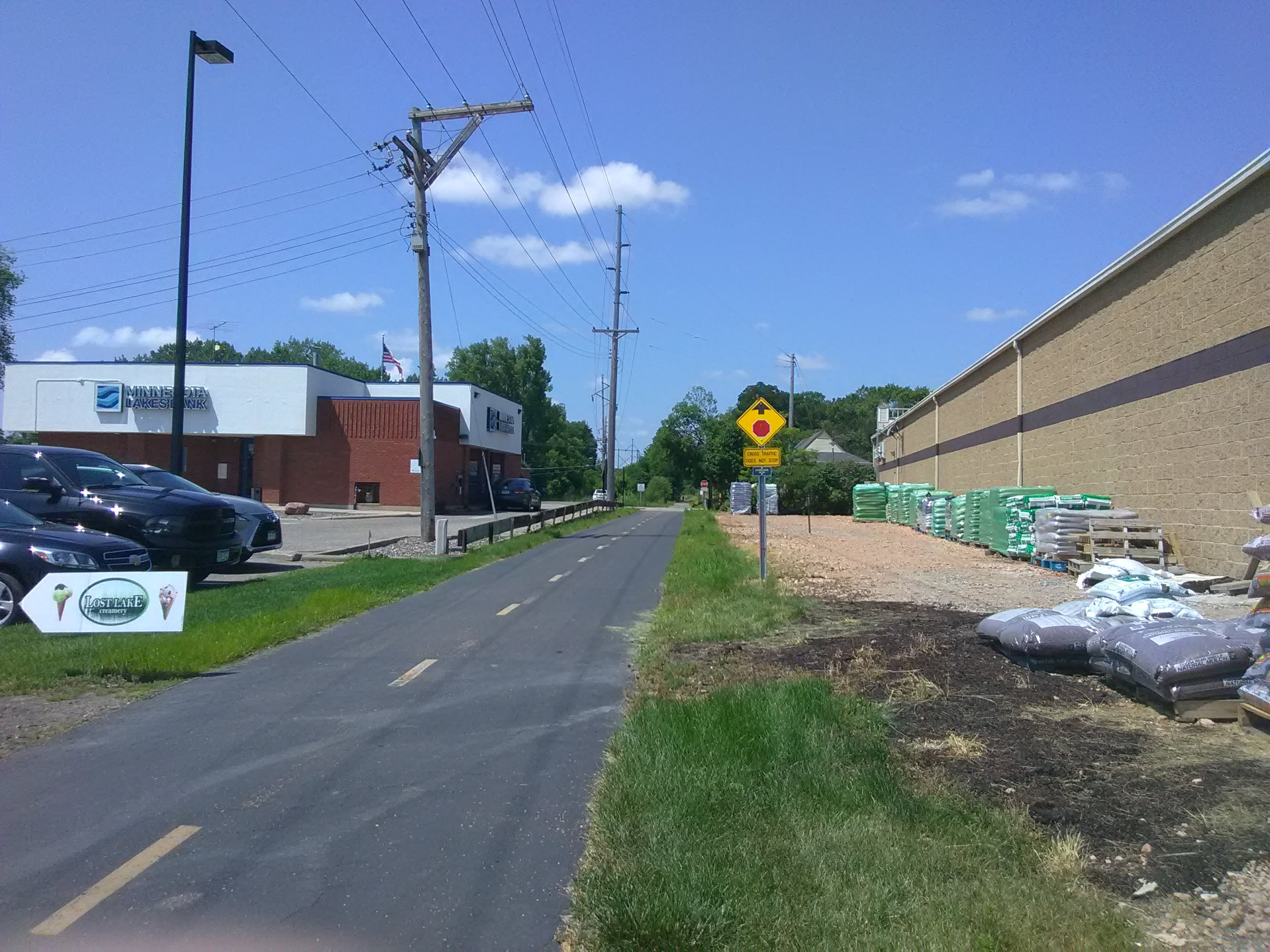
The trail entering Mound

The trail continues in the outskirts of St. Bonifacius. it passes over CSAH 92 and MN 7 on separate bridges. It continues towards Lake Minnetonka. It passes by Gale Woods Farm and enters Mound. It crosses CSAH 110 and CSAH 15 on crosswalks, and enters the Lake Minnetonka area. It runs parallel to CSAH 15, and will do so for the rest of its journey. It crosses Seton Channel on a historic rail bridge, and enters Spring Park. It parallels the West Arm, and crosses CSAH 19. It now parallels Crystal Bay and enters Minnetonka Beach. Along here, the trail crosses many private driveways. It has small concrete sections near them. It also travels through a golf course. It crosses over the Arcola Trestle. It and the Arcola Bridge are the longest bridges over Lake Minnetonka. The trail turns north, and goes into the village of Crystal Bay. It crosses over Tanager Lake, and turns east once more. It is now just north of CSAH 15, and passes under the ramps to US 12, and enters Wayzata. Previously ending at Shaver Park, in 2020 a short extension was completed as part of the city's lakefront plaza construction, bringing the trail past the Wayzata Depot and into downtown.

Early plans are being studied to continue the trail further east, into the city of Minnetonka with a goal of terminating near the Lake Minnetonka Regional Trail.

=== History ===
In 2008, Hennepin County (Three Rivers Park District) began building the Dakota Rail Trail. It was completed from Wayzata to St. Bonifacius in July 2009.

== Historical railroad bridges ==
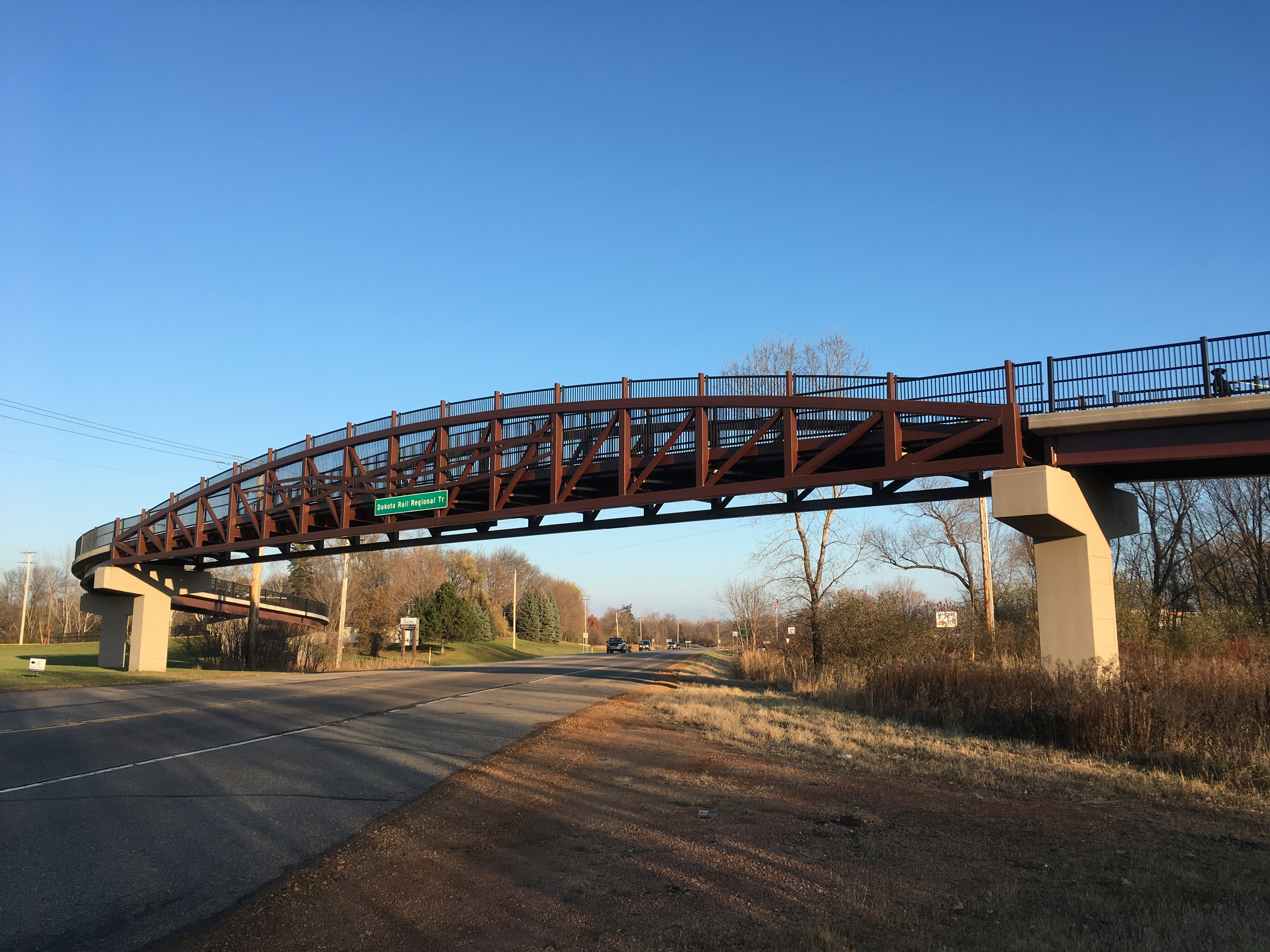
Modern bridge over Minnesota State Highway 7 in St. Bonifacius, Minnesota

Two major railroad bridges in Lake Minnetonka were preserved for the trail. The largest one is the Arcola Trestle, built in 1881. It is 550 feet (170 m) long. It consists of several spans of trestles with two through plate girder sections. A similar bridge is the Seton Channel Bridge in Spring Park, passing over Seton Channel. This one is 215 feet (66 m) long.

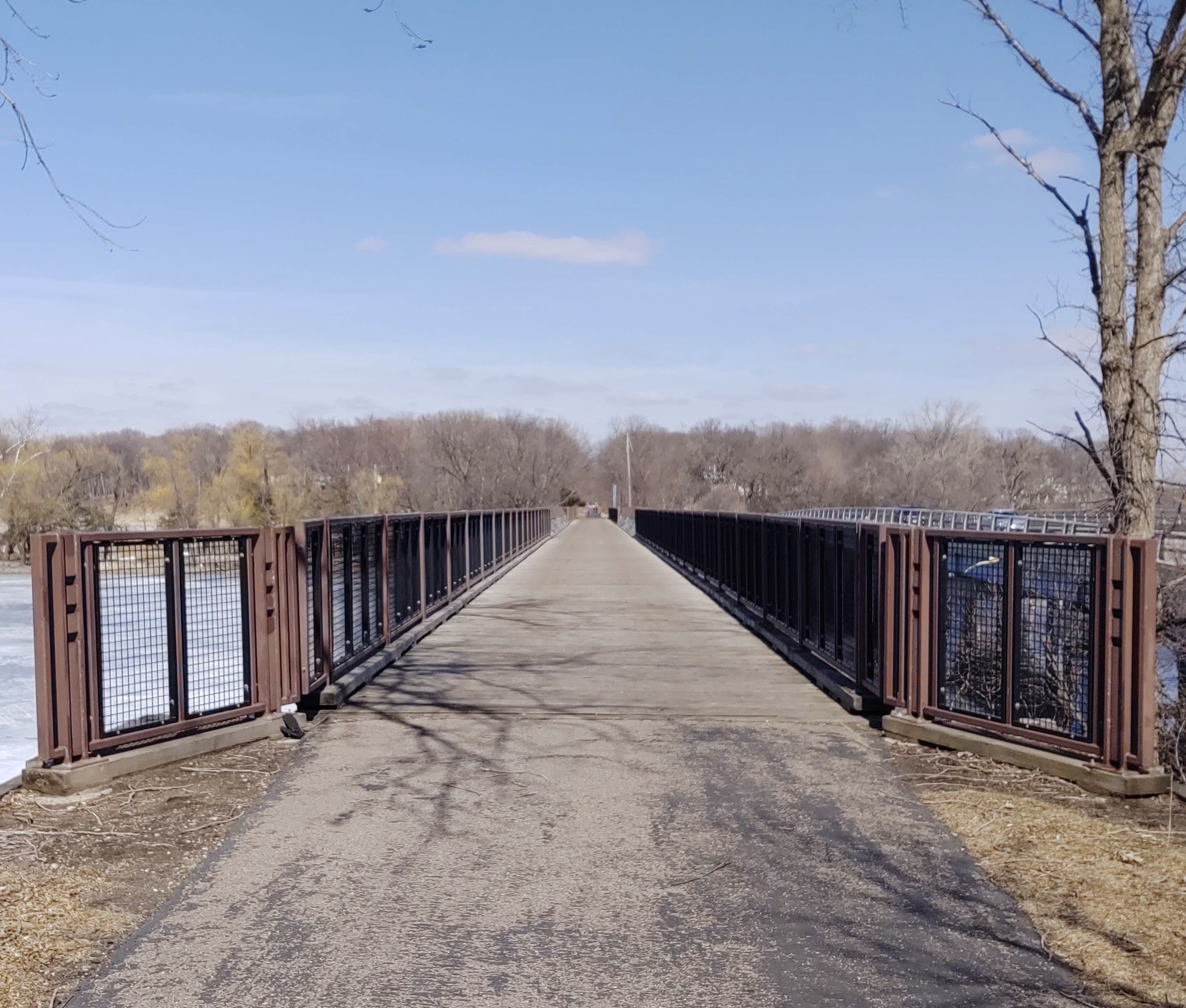
Arcola bridge, the longest bridge over Lake Minnetonka.

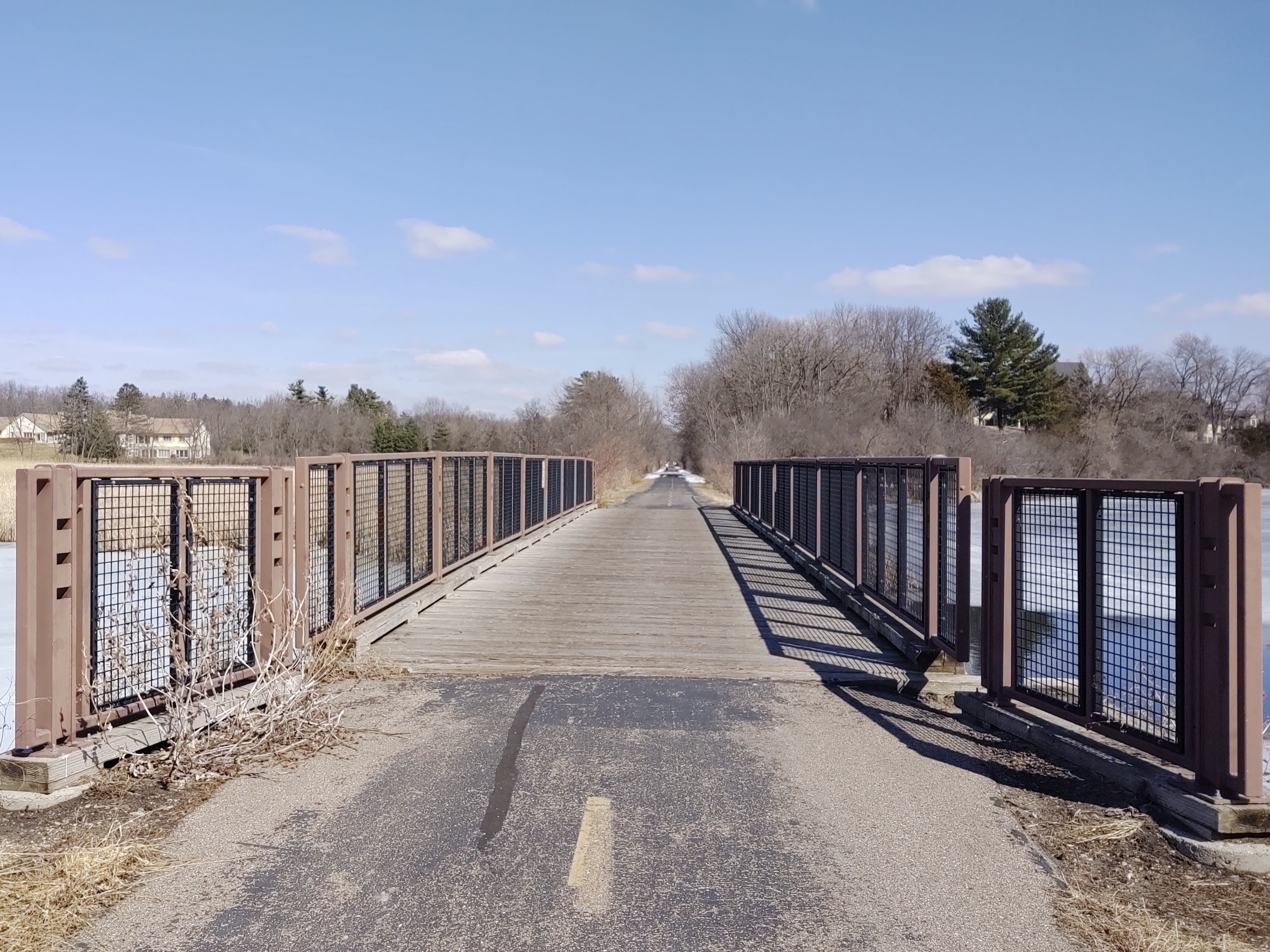
Tanager Lake Bridge
