= Robert Searles =

Robert Searles may refer to:

- Robert Searle, English buccaneer
- Robert Searle (minister), American Presbyterian minister
- Robert L. Searles, American businessman and politician
