= George S. Pillsbury =

American politician and businessman

Member of the Minnesota Senate
- In office January 5, 1971 – January 3, 1983
- Preceded by: Henry McKnight
- Succeeded by: Gen Olson

Personal details
- Born: July 17, 1921 Crystal Bay, Orono, Minnesota, U.S.
- Died: October 13, 2012 (aged 91) Orono, Minnesota, U.S
- Party: Republican
- Spouse: Sally Whitney (m. 1947)
- Children: 4 (including Charles)
- Relatives: Charles Alfred Pillsbury (grandfather); John Sargent Pillsbury (great-great uncle); John Pillsbury Snyder (cousin); Wheelock Whitney, Jr. (brother-in-law)
- Education: Yale University

Military service
- Allegiance: United States
- Branch/service: United States Marine Corps
- Years of service: 1943–1946
- Rank: First Lieutenant
- Battles/wars: World War II

George Sturgis Pillsbury (July 17, 1921 – October 13, 2012) was an American businessman and politician. His family was the founders and owners of the Pillsbury Company.

== Life ==
Pillsbury was born in Crystal Bay, Orono, Minnesota. He went to The Blake School in Hopkins, Minnesota, and to St. Paul's School in Concord, New Hampshire. In 1942, he graduated from Yale University, where he was a member of Delta Kappa Epsilon. Pillsbury served in the United States Marine Corps during World War II. He worked for the Pillsbury Company and lived in Wayzata, Minnesota. Pillsbury was also involved in the banking, railroad, and clothing businesses. Pillsbury served on the Orono School Board and was a Republican. Pillsbury served in the Minnesota Senate from 1971 to 1982. His grandfather Charles Alfred Pillsbury also served in the Minnesota Legislature. He died at his home on Lake Minnetonka in Orono, Minnesota.
