= Alarms and Diversions =

Alarms and Diversions may refer to:

- "Alarms and Diversions" (Tripper's Day), a 1984 television episode
- "Alarms and Diversions" (The Worst Witch), a 1999 television episode
- Alarms and Diversions, a painting by Alan Larkin
