= George Pillsbury =

George Pillsbury may refer to:

- George A. Pillsbury (1816–1898), businessman and miller associated with the formation of the Pillsbury Company
- George S. Pillsbury (1921–2012), American businessman and politician
