= Charles Pillsbury =

Charles Pillsbury may refer to:

- Charles Alfred Pillsbury (1842–1899), flour magnate
- Charles Pillsbury (attorney), Connecticut attorney and activist
