= Wayzata, Minnesota =

City in Minnesota, United States

- City
- City of Wayzata
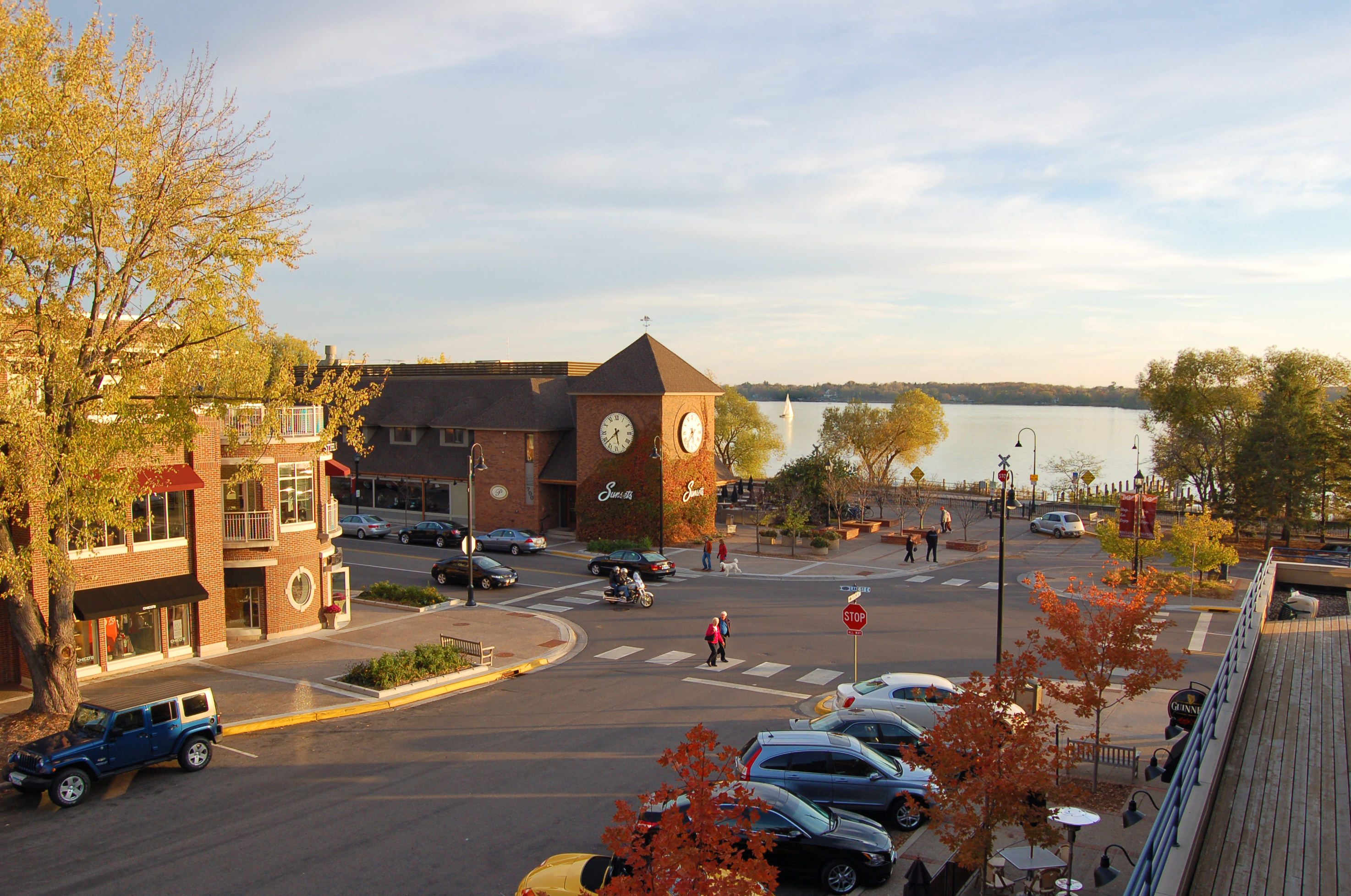
- Downtown Wayzata, October 2011

- Logo

- Location of Wayzata within Hennepin County, Minnesota
- Coordinates: 44°58′27″N 93°30′24″W
- Country: United States
- State: Minnesota
- County: Hennepin
- Founded: 1854
- Incorporated: 1883

Government
  - Mayor: Andrew Mullin

Area
  - Total: 4.70 sq mi (12.16 km^{2})
  - Land: 3.10 sq mi (8.02 km^{2})
  - Water: 1.60 sq mi (4.14 km^{2})
- Elevation: 942 ft (287 m)

Population (2020)
  - Total: 4,434
  - Estimate (2022): 4,338
  - Density: 1,431.9/sq mi (552.86/km^{2})
- Time zone: UTC-6 (Central (CST))
  - Summer (DST): UTC-5 (CDT)
- ZIP code: 55391
- Area code: 952
- FIPS code: 27-68818
- GNIS feature ID: 0653868
- Website: wayzata.org

Wayzata (/waɪˈzɛtə/ wy-ZET-ə) is a city in Hennepin County, Minnesota, United States. The population was 4,434 at the 2020 census. A suburb of the Twin Cities, Wayzata is located about 9 miles (14 km) west of Minneapolis along the northern shore of Lake Minnetonka, the state's ninth-largest lake.

Nicknamed "The Gateway to Lake Minnetonka," Wayzata is known for its upscale shopping and restaurant district along the lakeshore. Given its relative proximity to Minneapolis, the city is frequented by boaters, sailors, and visitors during the summer months.

== History ==
=== Early history ===
The name "Wayzata" comes from the Dakota word wazíyata, meaning “north” or “north shore.” The Mdewakanton, a subtribe of the Dakota nation, treasured Lake Minnetonka—the "Big Water"—as a place for hunting, fishing, and harvesting wild rice and maple sap. Spirit Knob, a peninsula in Wayzata Bay, was regarded as a particularly sacred place. The Dakota resided in this area of Minnesota until 1851, when the Treaty of Mendota was signed and land west of the Mississippi was opened for Euro-American settlement. Most Dakota were exiled from Minnesota after 1862.

Oscar E. Garrison originally platted Wayzata in 1854. In 1855, it saw an influx of Yankee settlers from New England and Upstate New York, who built a sawmill, a hotel, and a blacksmith shop. Most early settlers made their living by clear-cutting the land to grow corn and wheat. In 1857, this flourishing economy was nearly terminated by a grasshopper infestation, but the community rebounded when ginseng was discovered in the remaining hardwood forest. Ginseng root was in great demand as an aphrodisiac in China. During this boom, Wayzata became a collection center for ginseng roots discovered around Lake Minnetonka.

In 1867 the Saint Paul and Pacific Railroad extended its tracks to Wayzata, making it the area's transportation hub. The railroad was particularly important to local farmers because they now had easy access to markets in Minneapolis, Saint Paul, and beyond. The railroad also made Wayzata the original "gateway" to Lake Minnetonka, which was billed as a place of commanding beauty and good health.

=== Resort period ===
Wayzata section foreman's house, between Lake Minnetonka and the railroad tracks, an example of early construction in the city

In the 1860s and 1870s many small hotels and boarding houses were erected around Wayzata and Lake Minnetonka to accommodate tourists. One early example was the Maurer House-West Hotel, which was built near the corner of Lake Street and Broadway Avenue. Most local hotels and boarding houses were rather primitive until 1879, when the 150-room Hotel Saint Louis was built in Deephaven.

Most Lake Minnetonka tourists in the late 1800s arrived in Wayzata by train. Steamboats waited for new arrivals near the foot of Broadway Avenue and took them to destinations across the lake. Some of these steamboats, such as the City of Saint Louis and Belle of Minnetonka, were quite large. The Belle of Minnetonka was 300 feet (91 m) long and could purportedly carry 2,500 passengers.

Wayzata was officially incorporated as a village in 1883. One of the village council's first orders of business was to reroute the railroad tracks north of town. James J. Hill, who had become chairman of the newly formed Saint Paul, Minneapolis, & Manitoba Railway in 1879, initially ignored the council's order. When the council took the case to court, Hill reacted by demolishing the train station at the foot of Broadway Avenue and building a new one east of town at a stop called "Holdridge." He declared that Wayzata residents could "walk a mile for the next twenty years" to catch the train. Hill moved the tracks as well, but rather than rerouting them north of town, he moved them closer to the lake.

Hill was also connected to Wayzata and Lake Minnetonka through the Arlington Hotel, Hotel Lafayette, and Belle of Minnetonka, all owned by the Saint Paul, Minneapolis, & Manitoba Railway. He purchased Wayzata's Arlington Hotel in 1881 and never reopened it. By the 1890s, Lake Minnetonka had largely fallen out of favor as a vacation destination for wealthy tourists. A number of factors including new railroad regulations, new vacation spots, and a national economic depression contributed to this decline.

=== Cottage period ===
As national tourism to Lake Minnetonka faded in the 1890s, a new era for Wayzata began. Many urban dwellers began to construct summer cottages along Lake Minnetonka's shores as the Twin Cities grew. While many of these new cottages were modest, some were monumental. Wayzata became home to a large collection of grand country estates along the Ferndale Shore. Notable families who built country estates there include the Bells, Boveys, Crosbys, Peaveys, Pillsburys, and Washburns.

Despite the influx of new summer residences, Wayzata barely grew during this period. That changed in 1905, when the village council voted for a Reconciliation Ordinance to repair relations with Hill and his railway (now known as the “Great Northern”). He responded by building a new train depot near downtown Wayzata. At the depot's grand opening celebration in 1906, he declared it the “handsomest” on the entire Great Northern line.

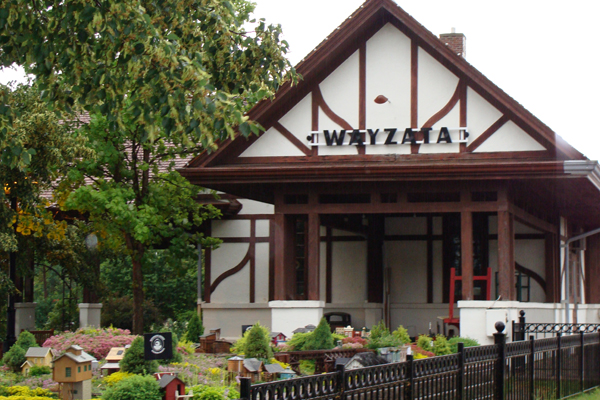
Great Northern depot, built 1906

Wayzata was also connected to a new form of water transportation in 1906. The Twin City Rapid Transit Company launched six new “Express Boats” on Lake Minnetonka that served as an extension of the Twin City streetcar system. The service was discontinued in 1926 after several years of declining ridership. Some of the Express Boats were scuttled (purposely sunk) in the lake that year. One, the Minnehaha, was raised from the depths in 1980, restored, and returned to passenger service in 1996.

As the cottage era continued, downtown Wayzata rebounded with residences and small commercial centers at each end of Lake Street. Motorboating was all the rage by 1920, and Wayzata was at the center of the trend with two nationally famous boat makers, Ramaley and Wise, based there. In 1929 the Ramaley Boat Company merged with Wise Boat Works and Walker Boat Works to form Minnetonka Boat Works. Minnetonka Boat Works eventually became well-known manufacturers and distributors of Tonka-Craft and Chris-Craft power boats.

=== 20th century ===
Wayzata's population nearly doubled in the decades leading up to World War II. Wayzatans were fortunate when one of their own, Mayor Rufus Rand, stepped forward to lead the town in meeting the challenges of modernizing its infrastructure. Under Rand, water and sewer service was provided to every building, streetlights were installed, roads were paved, and the public beach and park was opened.

After World War II, many local farms and summer cottages were converted for use as year-round, single-family homes. Many new homes and gas stations were also constructed during this time. U.S. Highway 12, which was built in the 1920s, was widened to four lanes, and the population swelled. Downtown Wayzata residences were replaced by more stores serving not only Wayzatans, but also new families moving onto the former farmlands outside Wayzata. By the 1950s, the greater Minneapolis-Saint Paul metropolitan area had reached Wayzata.

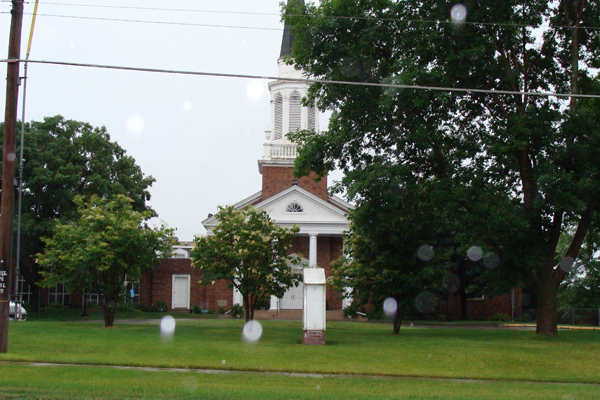
Wayzata Community Church

After it became a charter city, Wayzata began to annex land from Minnetonka, Plymouth, and Orono, and doubled in size. U.S. Highway 12 was widened again to become a freeway in the 1970s and a new shopping center opened 5 miles (8.0 km) down the road. These physical and economic changes caused some of Wayzata's downtown shops to be replaced by condominiums and office buildings. Strip malls and fast food franchises came to a part of the town near the highway.

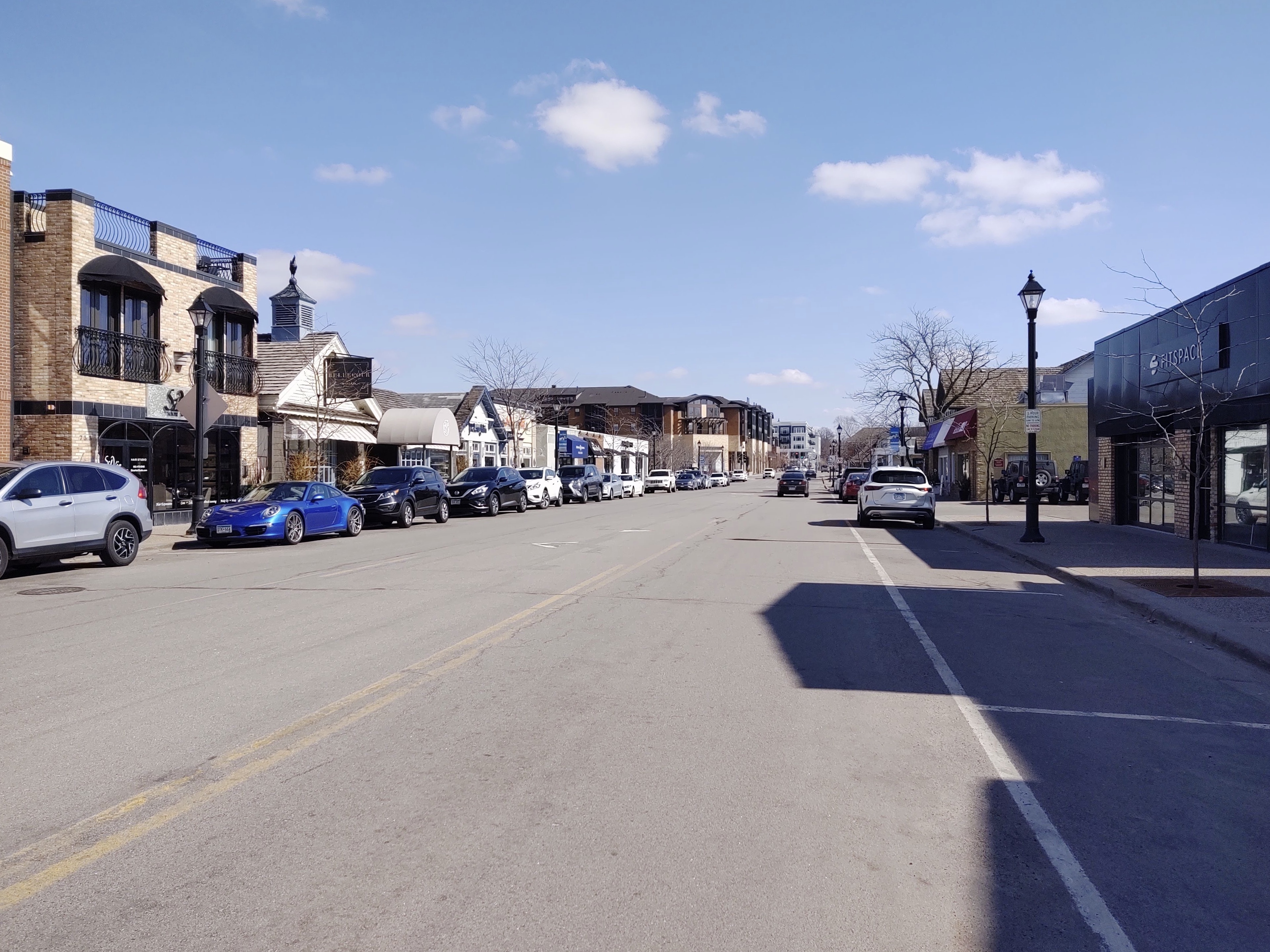
Lake Street in downtown

== Geography ==
Wayzata is a suburb of Minneapolis, Minnesota, 9 miles (14 kilometres) to its west on the northeast tip of Lake Minnetonka. According to the United States Census Bureau, the city has an area of 3.16 square miles (8.18 km^{2}), of which 3.08 square miles (7.98 km^{2}) is land and 0.08 square miles (0.21 km^{2}) is water. The "land cover types" that compose the Wayzata area in descending order by square acreage are open water (36%); residential areas, farmsteads, and commercial lands (35%); forest (13%); and farms (8%).

=== Climate ===
Wayzata's climate is humid continental, with hot summers, cold winters, and moderate autumns and springs. Average summer temperatures range from 56 to 82 degrees Fahrenheit. Average winter temperatures range from 2 to 27 degrees Fahrenheit. The average annual rainfall is 30.4 inches (77 cm). The average annual snowfall is 54.4 inches (138 cm).

=== Ecology ===
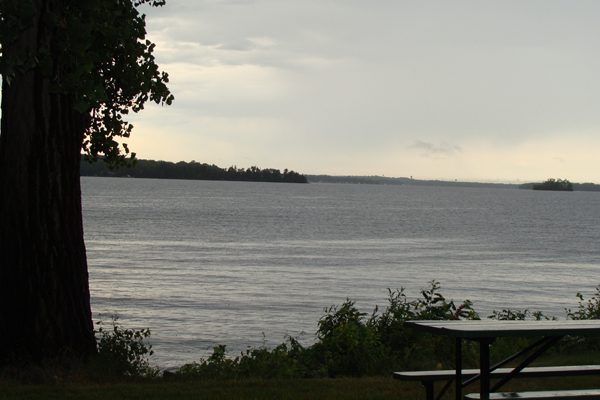
Lake Minnetonka

Before it was settled by Euro-Americans, the Wayzata area was largely "upland deciduous forest, with small inclusions of wet prairie, and lakes." Forest types typical in and around Wayzata have been "maple-basswood forest, oak forest, lowland hardwood forest, and floodplain forest. Non-native forest types within the city were predominantly disturbed second growth forest types made up of elm, box elder, ash, and cottonwood, with occasional basswood, maple, and oak." Some of the species of plants considered invasive in the Wayzata area are purple loosestrife, narrow-leaf cattail, common buckthorn, leafy spurge, tartarian honeysuckle, garlic mustard, reed canary grass, Siberian elm, and Amur maple. Some rare native species have also been seen in Wayzata, including the Acadian flycatcher, pugnose shiner, and red-shouldered hawk.

== Demographics ==
Historical population
Census	Pop.	Note	%±
1880	132		—
1890	273		106.8%
1900	276		1.1%
1910	492		78.3%
1920	633		28.7%
1930	1,100		73.8%
1940	1,473		33.9%
1950	1,791		21.6%
1960	3,219		79.7%
1970	3,700		14.9%
1980	3,621		−2.1%
1990	3,806		5.1%
2000	4,113		8.1%
2010	3,688		−10.3%
2020	4,434		20.2%
2022 (est.)	4,338		−2.2%
U.S. Decennial Census; 2020 Census

=== 2020 census ===
As of the 2020 census, Wayzata had a population of 4,434. The median age was 52.7 years. 15.6% of residents were under the age of 18 and 31.8% of residents were 65 years of age or older. For every 100 females there were 87.1 males, and for every 100 females age 18 and over there were 83.9 males age 18 and over.

98.2% of residents lived in urban areas, while 1.8% lived in rural areas.

There were 2,206 households in Wayzata, of which 18.9% had children under the age of 18 living in them. Of all households, 44.0% were married-couple households, 18.0% were households with a male householder and no spouse or partner present, and 33.5% were households with a female householder and no spouse or partner present. About 41.3% of all households were made up of individuals and 23.9% had someone living alone who was 65 years of age or older.

There were 2,496 housing units, of which 11.6% were vacant. The homeowner vacancy rate was 2.2% and the rental vacancy rate was 4.2%.

Racial composition as of the 2020 census
Race	Number	Percent
White	3,895	87.8%
Black or African American	131	3.0%
American Indian and Alaska Native	6	0.1%
Asian	129	2.9%
Native Hawaiian and Other Pacific Islander	0	0.0%
Some other race	97	2.2%
Two or more races	176	4.0%
Hispanic or Latino (of any race)	155	3.5%

=== 2010 Census ===
As of the census of 2010, there were 3,688 people, 1,795 households, and 944 families residing in the city. The population density was 1,197.4 inhabitants per square mile (462.3/km^{2}). There were 2,041 housing units, at an average density of 662.7 per square mile (255.9/km^{2}). The racial makeup of the city was 92.5% White, 3.0% African American, 0.4% Native American, 1.3% Asian, 0.1% Pacific Islander, 1.5% from other races, and 1.1% from two or more races. Hispanic or Latino residents of any race were 3.6% of the population.

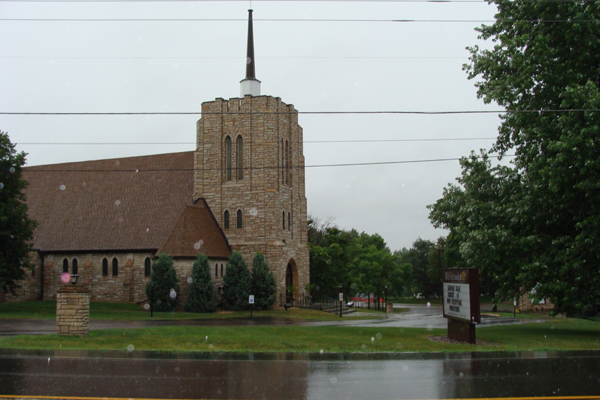
Redeemer Lutheran Church

There were 1,795 households, of which 20.8% included children under the age of 18, 42.3% were married couples living together, 7.2% had a female householder with no husband present, 3.1% had a male householder with no wife present, and 47.4% were non-families; 41.6% of all households were made up of individuals, and 18.3% had someone living alone who was 65 years of age or older. The average household size was 2.04, and the average family size was 2.80.

The median age in the city was 47.8 years; 19.1% of residents were under the age of 18; 6.3% were between the ages of 18 and 24; 20.7% were from 25 to 44; 31.9% were from 45 to 64; and 22.2% were 65 years of age or older. Among residents of the city, 47.5% were male and 52.5% were female.

=== 2000 Census ===
As of the census of 2000, there were 4,113 people, 1,929 households, and 1,041 families residing in the city. The population density was 1,292.6 persons per square mile (499.4/km^{2}). There were 2,047 housing units, at an average density of 643.3 per square mile (248.4/km^{2}). The racial makeup of the city was 96.11% White, 0.41% African American, 0.32% Native American, 1.34% Asian, 0.19% Pacific Islander, 0.75% from other races, and 0.88% from two or more races. Hispanic or Latino residents of any race were 1.41% of the population.

There were 1,929 households, of which 20.9% included children under the age of 18, 46.6% were married couples living together, 5.3% had a female householder with no husband present, and 46.0% were non-families; 39.5% of all households were made up of individuals, and 17.0% had someone living alone who was 65 years of age or older. The average household size was 2.06, and the average family size was 2.77.

The median age was 44 years; 19.3% of residents were under the age of 18, 6.0% were between the ages of 18 and 24, 25.8% were from 25 to 44, 28.1% were from 45 to 64, and 20.8% were 65 years of age or older. For every 100 females, there were 88.9 males. For every 100 females age 18 and over, there were 83.6 males.

The median income for a household in the city was $65,833, and the median income for a family was $96,859. Males had a median income of $51,000 versus $39,257 for females. The per capita income for the city was $63,859. None of the families and 2.3% of the population were living below the poverty line, including no under eighteens and 5.0% of those over 64.

== Politics ==
Andrew Mullin has been the mayor since 2025

Johanna Mouton was the mayor 2021–2025.

David Schelzel is the City Attorney.

Presidential election results

Precinct General Election Results
Year	Republican	Democratic	Third parties
2024	41.1% 1,162	56.6% 1,601	2.3% 64
2020	42.0% 1,350	56.3% 1,811	1.7% 57
2016	43.9% 1,238	48.0% 1,354	8.1% 231
2012	55.6% 1,405	43.2% 1,091	1.2% 32
2008	51.4% 1,286	47.3% 1,183	1.3% 34
2004	54.1% 1,372	44.7% 1,133	1.2% 51
2000	55.3% 1,370	39.4% 975	5.3% 131
1996	51.7% 1,179	40.5% 923	7.8% 180
1992	43.4% 1,042	32.3% 777	24.3% 131
1988	63.1% 1,422	36.9% 833	0.0% 0
1984	65.3% 1,486	34.7% 791	0.0% 0
1980	56.7% 1,195	33.6% 709	9.7% 205
1976	64.0% 1,427	34.2% 762	1.8% 40
1972	67.2% 1,327	31.1% 613	1.7% 34
1968	58.0% 1,095	39.8% 751	2.2% 41
1964	56.8% 997	42.8% 752	0.4% 7
1960	72.7% 1,248	27.2% 467	0.1% 1

== Economy ==
=== Corporate headquarters ===
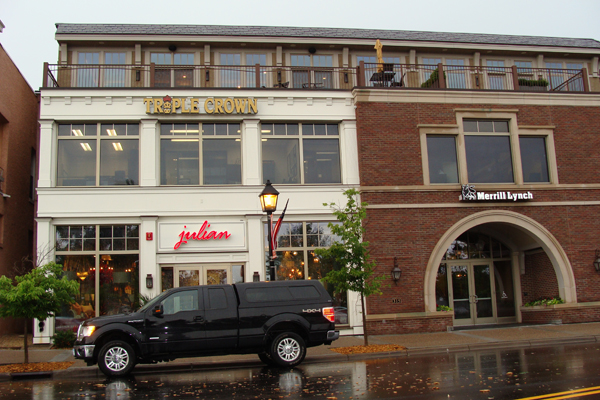
Local businesses

The corporate headquarters of both Cargill and Carlson are in Minnetonka, within 1 mile (1.6 km) of Wayzata. They are two of the largest employers in the Wayzata area.

The regional bank TCF was founded in Wayzata in 1923. The company was headquartered in Wayzata until 2019.

Northern Oil and Gas, Inc. is headquartered in Wayzata.

Ace Casual Furniture is headquartered in Wayzata.

=== Infrastructure ===
The United States Postal Service maintains a post office in Wayzata, which is assigned the ZIP code 55391. Although this ZIP code serves an area much larger than the city of Wayzata and includes seven other municipalities around eastern Lake Minnetonka, all locations in the ZIP code area use the name Wayzata in their postal addresses. The BNSF Railway serves Wayzata.

== Education ==
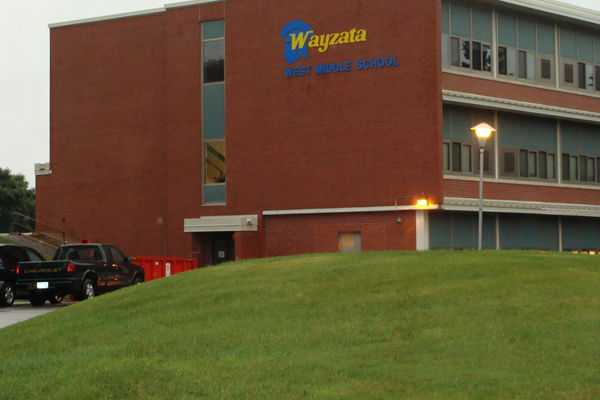
West Middle School

Wayzata Public Schools are part of Independent School District (ISD) 284 and serve all or parts of eight west suburban municipalities (Plymouth, Corcoran, Hamel, Maple Grove, Medicine Lake, Medina, Minnetonka, and Orono). The only school within Wayzata's city limits is West Middle School. The district covers 38 square miles (98 km^{2}), extending north and east from Wayzata Bay on Lake Minnetonka, and lies approximately 8 miles west of Minneapolis. There are approximately 9,510 students enrolled in eight public elementary schools (K–5), three middle schools (6–8), and one high school (9–12). Some students in the area attend public schools in other school districts that their families choose under Minnesota's open enrollment statute. In 2012, Newsweek ranked Wayzata High School one of the top 1,000 public high schools in the United States.

Schools in the Wayzata School District
Elementary schools	Middle schools	High School
Sunset Hill	West Middle School	Wayzata High School
Plymouth Creek	Central Middle School	
Oakwood	East Middle School	
Meadow Ridge
Kimberly Lane
Greenwood
Gleason Lake
Birchview
North Woods

== Parks and recreation ==
=== Dakota Rail Regional Trail ===
The Dakota Rail Trail is a 13.5 miles (21.7 km) paved regional trail. In Hennepin County, the trail winds around Lake Minnetonka through Wayzata, Orono, Minnetonka Beach, Spring Park, Mound, Minnetrista and Saint Bonifacius. The trail continues for 12.5 miles (20.1 km) in Carver County and terminates in Mayer. The trail is managed by the Three Rivers Park District.

=== Wayzata Beach ===
The Wayzata Beach is in downtown Wayzata on Lake Minnetonka. The beach is open to the public and has permit and non-permit parking. A lifeguard is on duty from mid-June to mid-August when the temperature is above 65 degrees Fahrenheit. The beach features

- A sandy beach and grassy peninsula
- Shaded picnic areas
- Playground equipment
- Canoe racks
- Stand-up paddleboard rentals
- Volleyball court
- Boat slips
- Playing fields

== In popular culture ==
In the 1990s TV series Beverly Hills, 90210, Brandon Walsh (Jason Priestley) and Brenda Walsh (Shannen Doherty) moved to California from Wayzata. In the show, both characters mispronounce Wayzata as "Way-za-da."

In the 1996 film Fargo, Jerry Lundegaard intends to purchase a parking lot in Wayzata.

Much of the 1999 film Drop Dead Gorgeous (starring Kirsten Dunst, Kirstie Alley, Denise Richards, Allison Janney, Ellen Barkin, Brittany Murphy, and Amy Adams) was filmed in Wayzata. Scenes were filmed at West Middle School, the Wayzata VFW, and 634 Park Street.

The character Ben Linus in the TV series Lost assumed the identity of a Henry Gale from Wayzata, Minnesota. In the show, the character mispronounces Wayzata as "Why-Zah-tah."

Aerial shots of Wayzata were featured in the fourth episode of the 2018 TV series The Assassination of Gianni Versace: American Crime Story.

== Notable people ==
- Salisbury Adams, Minnesota state legislator and lawyer
- James Ford Bell, first president of General Mills
- Al Quie, former Governor of Minnesota and U.S. Congressman
- Rufus Rand, politician and business executive
- Douglas Dayton, first president of Target
- Marchette Chute, U.S. author and biographer
- Eugene Larkin, Artist, printmaker, lithographer
- Dick Beardsley, long-distance runner and winner of the 1981 London Marathon
- Kent DuChaine, American blues singer and guitarist
- Kimberly Elise, film and television actress
- Orlando J. Heinitz, politician and businessman
- Stephen J. Hemsley, businessman
- Tim Herron, American professional golfer
- James Laurinaitis, linebacker for the Saint Louis Rams
- Lorie Line, pianist
- David Bromstad, designer and television personality
- Jim Ramstad, U.S. Representative
- Betsy Hodges, Mayor of Minneapolis from 2014 to 2018
- Robert L. Searles, Minnesota state representative and businessman
