= Waconia Public Schools =

School district in Waconia, Minnesota

Waconia Public Schools (ISD 110) is a public school district located in Carver County and Hennepin County. It serves approximately 4,000 students in the cities of Waconia, Minnetrista, Victoria, St. Bonifacius, and New Germany. The school district has three elementary schools that serve students in grades K-5, one middle school that serves students in grades 6–8, and one high school that serves students in grades 9–12.

== History ==
Each year from 2001 up to 2011, its student enrollment increased by about 5%. In 2011, there was an $8 million bond referendum so the district could acquire land for a new elementary school and a new high school, but voters rejected it with 2,676 against to 1,050 for it. Due to increasing enrollment, preschool classes were moved into a warehouse.

In September 2016, the District opened Laketown Elementary School, the District's third elementary school.

Voters approved referendum questions in 2014, 2018 and 2020 to improve facilities and increase the school district's per pupil general education revenue.

Leadership
Nancy Rajanen served as superintendent until her retirement effective June 30, 2014.

Effective July 1, 2014, Patrick Devine, previously the principal of the middle school of the Litchfield School District, was selected as the district's superintendent. Devine served as Superintendent until June 2022.

Brian Gersich started his tenure as Superintendent on July 1, 2022. Gersich previously served as Superintendent of the LeSueur-Henderson School District and as Assistant Superintendent of the Burnsville-Eagan-Savage School District.

== Academics ==
Waconia Public Schools was named the 19th best public school district in the state of Minnesota by Niche. The district has a 95% four-year graduation rate, a 17:1 student to teacher ratio, and 65% of teachers who have advanced degrees.

== Schools ==
Secondary

- Waconia High School
- Waconia Middle School

Primary

- Bayview Elementary School
- Laketown Elementary School
- Southview Elementary School

Preschool

- Early Childhood Center

Other

- Waconia Learning Center
