= Eugene Larkin =

American artist (1921-2010)

- Born: June 27, 1921; Wayzata, Minnesota
- Died: November 13, 2010 (aged 89); South Bend, Indiana
- Education: University of Minnesota
- Known for: Woodblock printmaking, lithography, collage
- Website: eugenelarkin.com

Eugene Larkin (1921 – 2010) was an American artist who specialized in woodblock printmaking, lithography, and collage.

== Biography ==
Larkin was born on June 27, 1921 in Wayzata, Minnesota to John P. and Martha (VandeVere) Larkin. Interested in art from childhood, at age 23 his woodcuts were displayed at Harriet Hanley gallery in Minneapolis.

In 1947 Larkin married Audrey J. Krueger of St. Paul, Minnesota. They had two children together, Andrew and Alan Larkin, both of whom are also artists.

After graduating from the University of Minnesota, Larkin taught for six years at Kansas State College. In 1954, he began teaching printmaking at the Minneapolis School of Art and eventually became head of the printmaking department. From 1969 to 1991, Larkin was a professor in the design department at the University of Minnesota- St. Paul. During his professorship, he wrote a book titled Design: The Search for Unity.

Larkin died November 13, 2010 in South Bend, Indiana.

== Artistry and influences ==
Larkin worked primarily with woodcuts. He was inspired by the natural world, using plant materials in his work and prioritizing textures in his prints. He was also fascinated with mythology and often combined mythical imagery with natural textures.

Throughout his career, Larkin drew inspiration from music, making drawings of string quartets he would host at his home and creating prints based on his drawings. In 1991, he exhibited woodblock prints inspired by Walt Whitman's "Song of Myself" poem at Goldstein Gallery.

Larkin's work is housed in various museums and galleries, including the Art Institute of Chicago, Library of Congress, Walker Art Center, and Smithsonian American Art Museum.
