= Orono, Minnesota =

Rural city in Minnesota, United States

- City
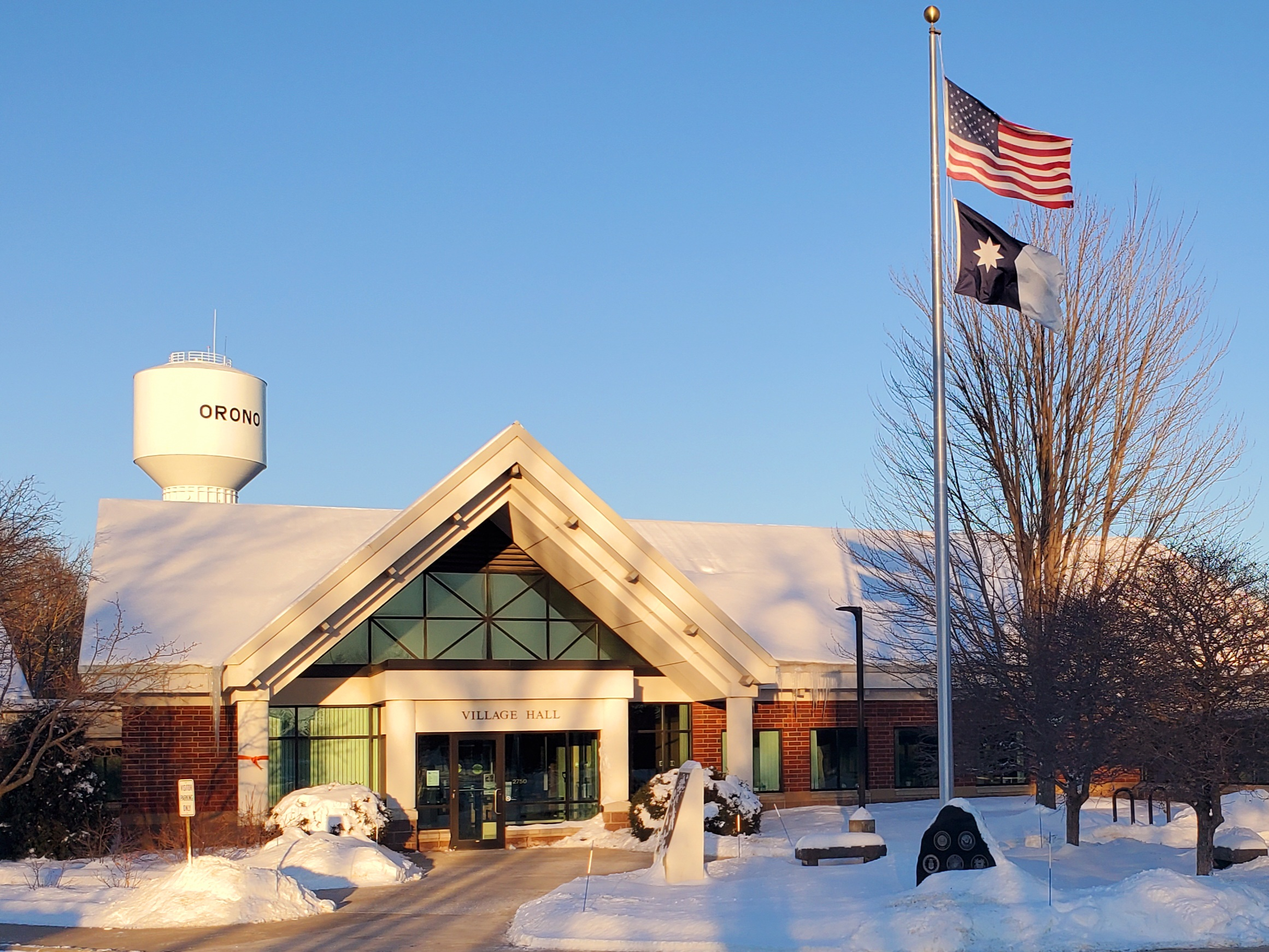
- Orono City Hall

- Seal
- Motto: "The Lakeshore City"
- Location of Orono within Hennepin County, Minnesota
- Coordinates: 44°58′16″N 93°36′14″W
- Country: United States
- State: Minnesota
- County: Hennepin
- Founded: 1889
- Incorporated: 1955

Government
  - Mayor: Bob Tunheim

Area
  - Total: 23.98 sq mi (62.12 km^{2})
  - Land: 15.92 sq mi (41.22 km^{2})
  - Water: 8.07 sq mi (20.90 km^{2})
- Elevation: 971 ft (296 m)

Population (2020)
  - Total: 8,315
  - Density: 522/sq mi (201.7/km^{2})
- Time zone: UTC-6 (Central (CST))
  - Summer (DST): UTC-5 (CDT)
- ZIP codes: 55300, 55391, 55399, 55356
- Area code: 952
- FIPS code: 27-48580
- GNIS feature ID: 0648996
- Website: https://www.oronomn.gov/

Orono (/ˈɔːrəˌnoʊ/ OR-ə-noh, /ˈɔːrnoʊ/ OR-noh) is a city in Hennepin County, Minnesota, United States. It is a suburb of Minneapolis about 16 miles (26 km) west of Lake Minnetonka's north shore. The population was 8,315 at the 2020 census.

Orono is the largest municipality by area on Lake Minnetonka and is largely residential.

== History ==
Orono was originally part of Excelsior Township. In 1868, it became part of Medina Township. Residents received permission from Hennepin County to form the independent town of Orono in 1889. It was incorporated as a city in 1955.

Orono is named after Orono, Maine, the hometown of early resident George A. Brackett.

Fire Service

On November 21, 2023, a Hennepin County Court found Orono in contempt for violating an injunctive relief order designed to safeguard the Long Lake Fire Department, its longstanding fire service provider. The court issued the order after Orono hired the Long Lake Fire Chief, attempted to take control of Long Lake Station 2, purchased a ladder truck Long Lake was considering, and asked the state legislator to forcibly transfer Long Lake's pensions to Orono to build its own fire department, while Long Lake remains contracted to serve Orono, Minnetonka Beach, and Medina. The contempt order was likely the first ever issued to a Minnesota municipality and resulted from the city willfully disobeying the provisions of the injunction prohibiting the recruitment of Long Lake firefighters and the use of Long Lake Station 2. The court also found that Mayor Dennis Walsh and Fire Chief James Van Eyll colluded to intimidate a Long Lake firefighter in violation of the order and fined the city for its violations.

== Geography ==
According to the United States Census Bureau, the city has an area of 25.15 square miles (65.14 km^{2}), of which 15.98 square miles (41.39 km^{2}) is land and 9.17 square miles (23.75 km^{2}) is water. U.S. Highway 12 serves as a main route.

== Demographics ==
Historical population
Census	Pop.	Note	%±
1890	872		—
1900	1,086		24.5%
1910	1,311		20.7%
1920	1,159		−11.6%
1930	1,795		54.9%
1940	2,780		54.9%
1950	4,863		74.9%
1960	5,643		16.0%
1970	6,787		20.3%
1980	6,845		0.9%
1990	7,285		6.4%
2000	7,538		3.5%
2010	7,437		−1.3%
2020	8,315		11.8%
U.S. Decennial Census

=== 2020 census ===
As of the 2020 census, Orono had a population of 8,315. The median age was 47.0 years. 23.7% of residents were under the age of 18 and 19.2% of residents were 65 years of age or older. For every 100 females there were 101.8 males, and for every 100 females age 18 and over there were 99.9 males age 18 and over.

79.5% of residents lived in urban areas, while 20.5% lived in rural areas.

There were 3,152 households in Orono, of which 31.9% had children under the age of 18 living in them. Of all households, 67.3% were married-couple households, 13.2% were households with a male householder and no spouse or partner present, and 15.3% were households with a female householder and no spouse or partner present. About 19.6% of all households were made up of individuals and 10.2% had someone living alone who was 65 years of age or older.

There were 3,429 housing units, of which 8.1% were vacant. The homeowner vacancy rate was 0.9% and the rental vacancy rate was 4.1%.

Racial composition as of the 2020 census
Race	Number	Percent
White	7,688	92.5%
Black or African American	33	0.4%
American Indian and Alaska Native	20	0.2%
Asian	121	1.5%
Native Hawaiian and Other Pacific Islander	3	0.0%
Some other race	66	0.8%
Two or more races	384	4.6%
Hispanic or Latino (of any race)	201	2.4%

=== 2010 census ===
As of the census of 2010, there were 7,437 people, 2,826 households, and 2,155 families living in the city. The population density was 465.4 inhabitants per square mile (179.7/km^{2}). There were 3,209 housing units at an average density of 200.8 per square mile (77.5/km^{2}). The racial makeup of the city was 96.5% White, 0.4% African American, 0.2% Native American, 1.1% Asian, 0.6% from other races, and 1.1% from two or more races. Hispanic or Latino of any race were 1.7% of the population.

There were 2,826 households, of which 35.2% had children under the age of 18 living with them, 67.7% were married couples living together, 5.5% had a female householder with no husband present, 3.1% had a male householder with no wife present, and 23.7% were non-families. 18.5% of all households were made up of individuals, and 6.7% had someone living alone who was 65 years of age or older. The average household size was 2.63 and the average family size was 3.02. As of the 2013 American Community Survey, the Orono median household and family incomes are $100,362 and $117,024, respectively. Less than 2.5% of all families are living at or below the poverty level.

The median age in the city was 45.7 years. 26.6% of residents were under the age of 18; 4.3% were between the ages of 18 and 24; 17.7% were from 25 to 44; 38.8% were from 45 to 64; and 12.6% were 65 years of age or older. The gender makeup of the city was 51.2% male and 48.8% female.

=== 2000 census ===
As of the census of 2000, there were 7,538 people, 2,766 households, and 2,196 families living in the city. The population density was 468.9 inhabitants per square mile (181.0/km^{2}). There were 2,909 housing units at an average density of 181.0 per square mile (69.9/km^{2}). The racial makeup of the city was 97.73% White, 0.27% African American, 0.15% Native American, 0.94% Asian, 0.24% from other races, and 0.68% from two or more races. Hispanic or Latino of any race were 0.86% of the population.

There were 2,766 households, out of which 38.0% had children under the age of 18 living with them, 71.8% were married couples living together, 5.2% had a female householder with no husband present, and 20.6% were non-families. 15.8% of all households were made up of individuals, and 4.2% had someone living alone who was 65 years of age or older. The average household size was 2.72 and the average family size was 3.06.

In the city, the population was spread out, with 27.4% under the age of 18, 4.5% from 18 to 24, 26.7% from 25 to 44, 32.5% from 45 to 64, and 9.0% who were 65 years of age or older. The median age was 41 years. For every 100 females, there were 103.5 males. For every 100 females age 18 and over, there were 102.0 males.

The median income for a household in the city was $88,314, and the median income for a family was $101,114. Males had a median income of $61,913 versus $34,964 for females. The per capita income for the city was $65,825. About 0.5% of families and 1.2% of the population were below the poverty line, including 1.0% of those under age 18 and 1.6% of those age 65 or over.

== Politics ==
Presidential election results

Precinct General Election Results
Year	Republican	Democratic	Third parties
2024	47.6% 2,834	49.9% 2,969	2.6% 153
2020	47.6% 2,894	50.3% 3,059	2.1% 126
2016	49.1% 2,552	41.6% 2,162	9.3% 483
2012	61.6% 3,146	37.1% 1,892	1.3% 68
2008	56.5% 2,788	42.0% 2,073	1.5% 70
2004	59.1% 3,021	39.9% 2,038	1.0% 50
2000	59.7% 2,840	35.0% 1,667	5.3% 251
1996	55.3% 2,346	35.6% 1,510	9.1% 384
1992	44.3% 2,038	29.9% 1,377	25.8% 1,188
1988	65.9% 2,728	34.1% 1,412	0.0% 0
1984	66.8% 2,538	33.2% 1,263	0.0% 0
1980	57.1% 2,174	28.5% 1,085	14.4% 547
1976	60.8% 2,257	37.6% 1,393	1.6% 60
1968	55.0% 1,601	41.6% 1,210	3.4% 99
1964	54.8% 1,599	45.2% 1,318	0.0% 0
1960	65.7% 1,888	34.1% 979	0.2% 5

== Notable people ==
- George A. Brackett - Early Minnesota businessman and politician
- Carlos Correa - former Minnesota Twins shortstop.
- Bruce Dayton - Retail executive and philanthropist, former chairman and CEO of the Dayton Hudson Corporation (now the Target Corporation), founder of B. Dalton bookstores
- Mark Dayton - Former senator, governor, and former resident. Married Aida Rockefeller (1978–1986).
- William Hood Dunwoody - Had a summer home on Brackett's Point.
- Kevin Garnett - National Basketball Association player
- James J. Hill - The Empire Builder who had a farm on Crystal Bay to supply his Hotel Lafayette. Gave Hill School to the community.
- Irwin L. Jacobs - Corporate raider and entrepreneur
- Greg LeMond - racing cyclist and former resident.
- Whitney MacMillan - Billionaire and former chairman of the Board and CEO of Cargill
- William W. McGuire - former chairman and CEO of UnitedHealth Group and current owner of the Minnesota United FC soccer team
- Charles Pillsbury - former resident and namesake for the "Doonesbury" character.
- George S. Pillsbury - was an American businessman and politician.
- Robert L. Searles - businessman, Minnesota state representative, and mayor of Orono.
- Gregg Steinhafel - The former president, CEO, and chairman of the board of Target Corporation

== See also ==
- Crystal Bay, Minnesota
