= Waconia High School =

Location
- 1650 Community Drive; Waconia, Minnesota 55387; United States
- Coordinates: 44.8360°N 93.8195°W

Information
- Type: Public secondary
- School district: Waconia Public Schools
- Principal: Paul Sparby
- Teaching staff: 72.84 (FTE)
- Grades: 9–12
- Enrollment: 1,342 (2023–2024)
- Student to teacher ratio: 18.42
- Colors: Purple and gold
- Athletics conference: Metro West Conference
- Nickname: Wildcats
- Website: www.isd110.org/our-schools/waconia-high-school

Waconia High School is a public high school located in Waconia, Minnesota, United States. A part of Waconia Public Schools, the school has an enrollment of approximately 1,200 students in grades 9 through 12 and serves the communities of Waconia, St. Bonifacius, Minnetrista, Victoria and New Germany.

== History ==
After a previous 2011 referendum failed, a November 2014 referendum to expand Clearwater Middle School and turn it in to a new high school passed.

== Demographics ==
WHS is 92% white, 4% Hispanic, 1% black and 1% Asian. 1% of students also identify as a part of two or more races.

== Academics ==
Advanced Placement program classes are offered at Waconia. About forty percent of WHS students take at least one AP class at some point in high school.

== Athletics ==
After previously competing in the Wright County Conference, Wildcat teams moved to the Metro West Conference in advance of the 2020–2021 school year.

=== Team State Championships ===
- Baseball: 2017
- Dance: 1984, 1989, 1990, 1991, 1997 (high kick/precision), 1999 (tie; jazz/funk)
- Boys golf: 1977, 1978, 1979, 1980

=== Individual State Championships ===
- Stu Oftelie, Boys Golf: 1979, 1980
- Jaye Blanshan, Wrestling: 1980
- Tyler Wagener, Wrestling: 2017, 2018
- Cade Mueller, Wrestling: 2018
- Max McEnelly, Wrestling: 2020, 2021, 2022, 2023
- Jack Hackler, Boys Swimming 100-yard Breaststroke: 2024, 2025
- Kaia Bauerova, Gymnastics Vault: 2025

== Performing arts ==
Waconia has two competitive show choirs: the Varsity-level "Power Company", the Junior varsity-level mixed group "The Current", and formerly, the Junior varsity-level women's group "Illuminations". The show choir program also hosts the annual Waconia Star Power show choir competition the third weekend of February.

The band program hosts The Lake Waconia Band Festival every year in the third week of June.

== Notable alumni ==
- Maxx Williams, NFL tight end
- Jenn Bostic, singer/songwriter
