= Andrew Mullin =

American businessman and politician

James Andrew Mullin (Andrew)
- Born: January 12, 1971 (age 55); Minneapolis, Minnesota
- Citizenship: American
- Education: University of Wisconsin-Madison (BA) University of St. Thomas Opus College of Business (MBA)
- Occupations: Businessman, politician
- Spouse: Kristyn Mullin
- Children: Walker, Lillyan Paige
- Website: andrewmullin.com

Andrew Mullin (born January 12, 1971) is an American businessman and politician currently serving as the Mayor of Wayzata, Minnesota. Before his election as mayor in November 2024, Mullin served two terms on the Wayzata City Council from 2008 to 2016, where he was appointed mayor pro tem in 2015.

== Early life and education ==
Mullin was born on January 12, 1971, in Minneapolis, Minnesota, to James and Franchelle Mullin. He attended Breck School in Golden Valley, Minnesota, graduating in 1989. He completed a Bachelor of Arts in History and Political Science from the University of Wisconsin–Madison in 1993. Mullin later completed an MBA from the University of St. Thomas Opus College of Business in 2001.

== Career ==
=== Business career ===
As of 2025, Mullin is a Vice President at EarthDaily Analytics, a vertically integrated provider of Earth Observation data, analytics, and solutions. Andrew has held marketing roles in high tech, media/publishing, and a marketing agency.

=== Political career ===
Mullin entered politics by successfully running for Wayzata City Council in 2008, receiving 1,210 votes. He served as mayor pro tem in 2015. He was re-elected in 2016, getting 1,261 votes. In the 2024 election for Mayor, Mullin got 1,309 votes and won again from the same Wayzata constituency.

== Community Involvement and Awards ==
Mullin has been a part of several community-based initiatives, including:

- Panoway on Wayzata Bay: Overseeing the planning and implementation of the public-private partnership to improve, restore, and enhance the public space along the shore of Lake Minnetonka in downtown Wayzata.
- 9/11 Memorial in Wayzata: Led fundraising and implementation efforts for a memorial honoring 9/11 victims from Minnesota along the shores of Lake Minnetonka in downtown Wayzata.

== Personal life ==
Mullin is married to Kristyn Mullin. The couple has a son, Walker Mullin, and a daughter, Lillyan Paige Mullin.
