= Salisbury Adams =

American lawyer

- Born: Salisbury Adams; April 24, 1925; Duluth, Minnesota.
- Died: March 21, 2004 (aged 78)
- Occupations: Lawyer; Politician

Salisbury Adams (April 24, 1925 – March 21, 2004) was an American lawyer and politician.

Adams was born in Duluth, Minnesota. He served in the United States Navy, on a minesweeper off the coast of California, during World War II. Adams received his bachelor's degree in metallurgical engineering from University of Minnesota and his law degree from Harvard Law School in 1952. He was admitted to the Minnesota bar. Adams lived in Wayzata, Minnesota with his wife and family. He served on the Wayzata School Board from 1958 to 1962. Adams then served in the Minnesota House of Representatives from 1963 to 1976 and was a Republican. Adams then served on the Minnesota Metropolitan Waste Control Commission from 1979 to 1982. He then lived in Jackson Hole, Wyoming. Adams died from cancer in Redding, Connecticut.
