= St. Bonifacius, Minnesota =

City in Minnesota, United States

Coordinates: 44°54′16″N 93°44′38″W

- City
- Nickname: St. Boni
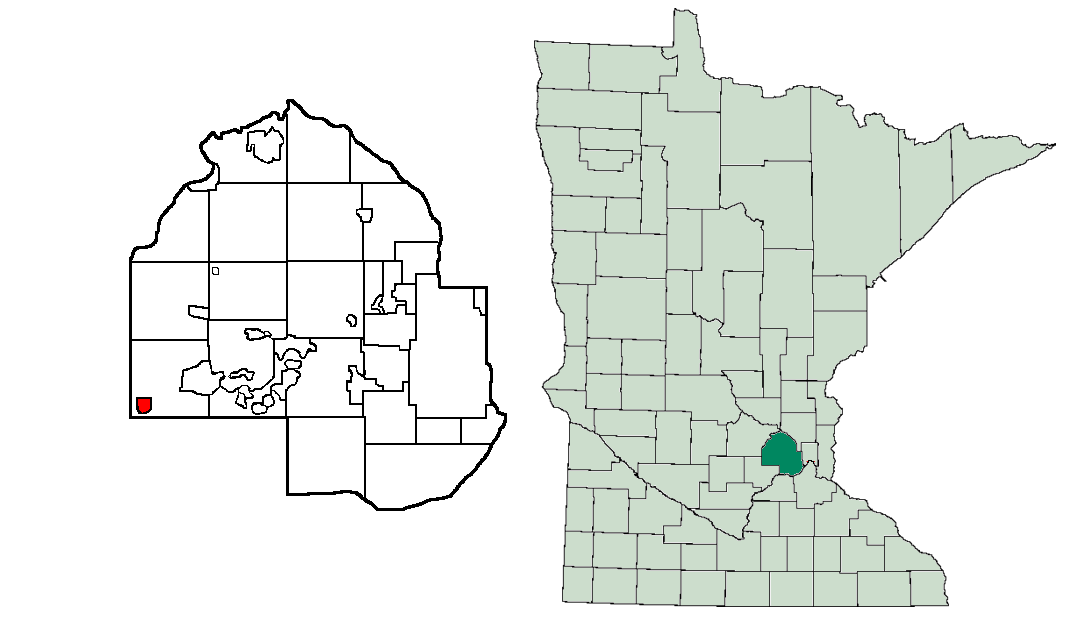
- Location of Saint Bonifacius within Hennepin County, Minnesota
- Country: United States
- State: Minnesota
- County: Hennepin
- Incorporated: 1858 (village); 1904 (city)

Government
  - Mayor: Tim Eiler

Area
  - Total: 1.04 sq mi (2.70 km^{2})
  - Land: 1.04 sq mi (2.69 km^{2})
  - Water: 0 sq mi (0.00 km^{2})

Population (2020)
  - Total: 2,307
  - Density: 2,220/sq mi (857/km^{2})
- Time zone: UTC-6 (Central (CST))
  - Summer (DST): UTC-5 (CDT)
- ZIP code: 55375
- Area code(s): 952 and 763
- FIPS code: 27-56770
- GNIS feature ID: 2396475
- Website: cityofstboni.gov

Saint Bonifacius, often stylized as St. Bonifacius, is a small city in Hennepin County, Minnesota, United States, 25 miles (40 km) west of Minneapolis. Settled in the 1850s, the town has a combination of rural and exurban features. It is completely surrounded by Minnetrista, Minnesota, and is close to the county line with Carver County. It hosted a Nike Hercules battery during the Cold War, one of four protecting Minneapolis–Saint Paul from Soviet bombers.

The population was 2,307 at the 2020 census. The Dakota Rail Regional Trail runs through town.

== History ==
Saint Bonifacius is named after Saint Boniface, an 8th century apostle to the Germans and the patron saint of Germany. Saint Bonifacius was settled in the 1850s by German migrants. It became a village in 1858 and a city in 1904.

== Geography ==
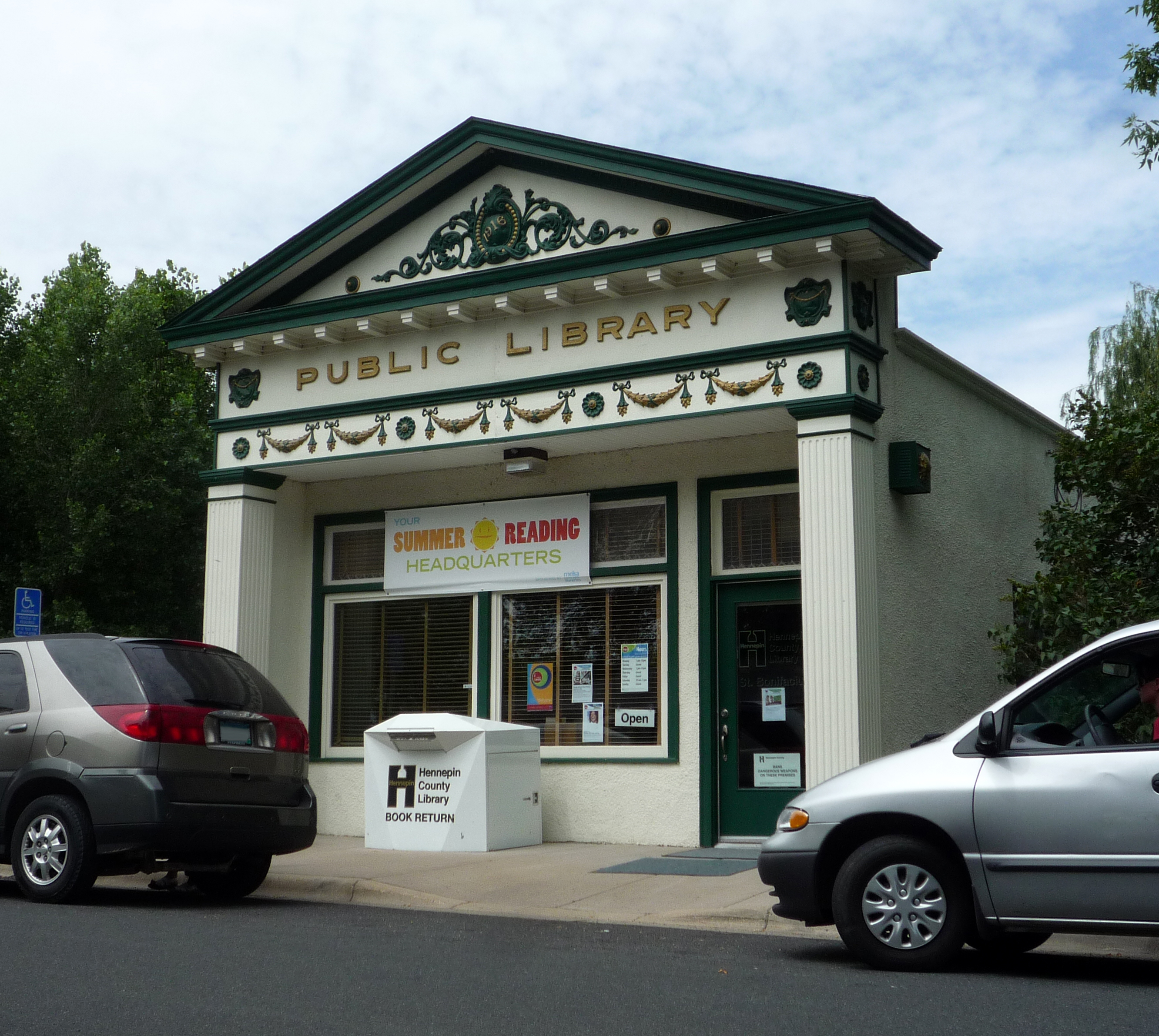
St. Bonifacius Library

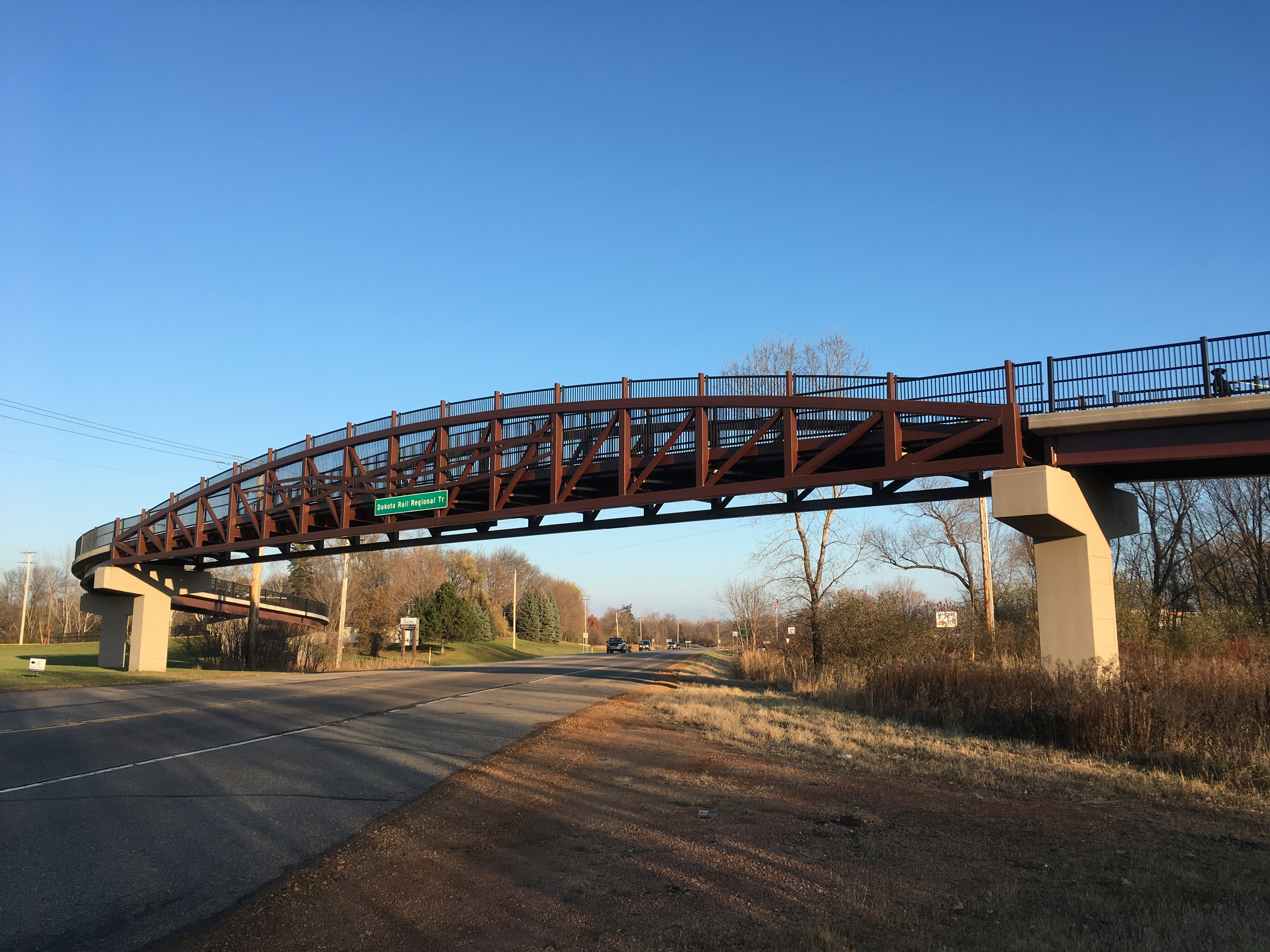
Bridge over Minnesota State Highway 7 in St. Bonifacius, Minnesota, part of the Dakota Rail Regional Trail, a biking and hiking trail

According to the United States Census Bureau, the city has an area of 1.07 square miles (2.77 km^{2}), of which 1.06 square miles (2.75 km^{2}) is land and 0.01 square miles (0.03 km^{2}) is water. It is completely surrounded by the city of Minnetrista.

== Demographics ==
Historical population
Census	Pop.	Note	%±
1910	275		—
1920	332		20.7%
1930	336		1.2%
1940	363		8.0%
1950	438		20.7%
1960	576		31.5%
1970	685		18.9%
1980	857		25.1%
1990	1,180		37.7%
2000	1,873		58.7%
2010	2,283		21.9%
2020	2,307		1.1%
U.S. Decennial Census

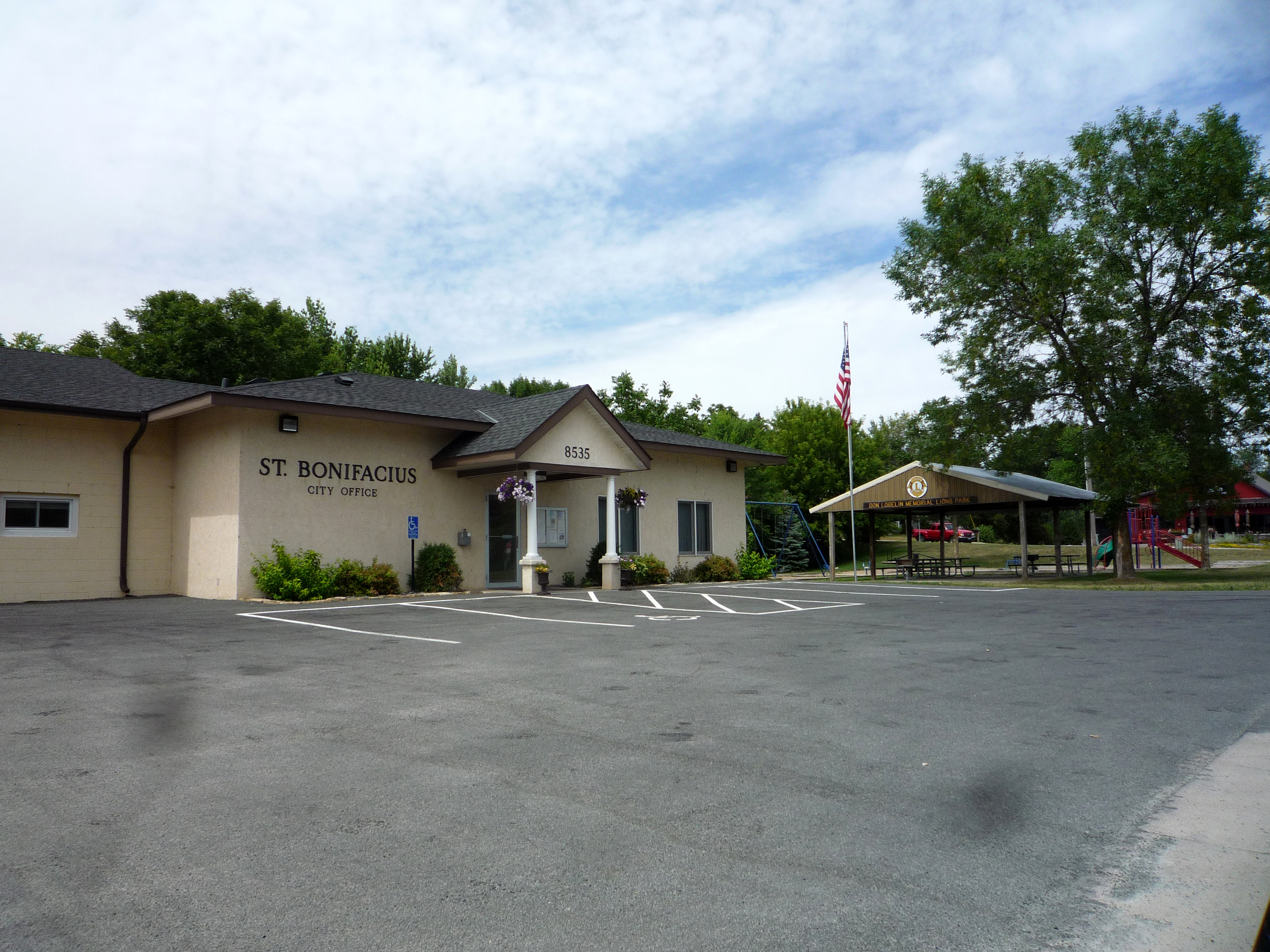
City Hall

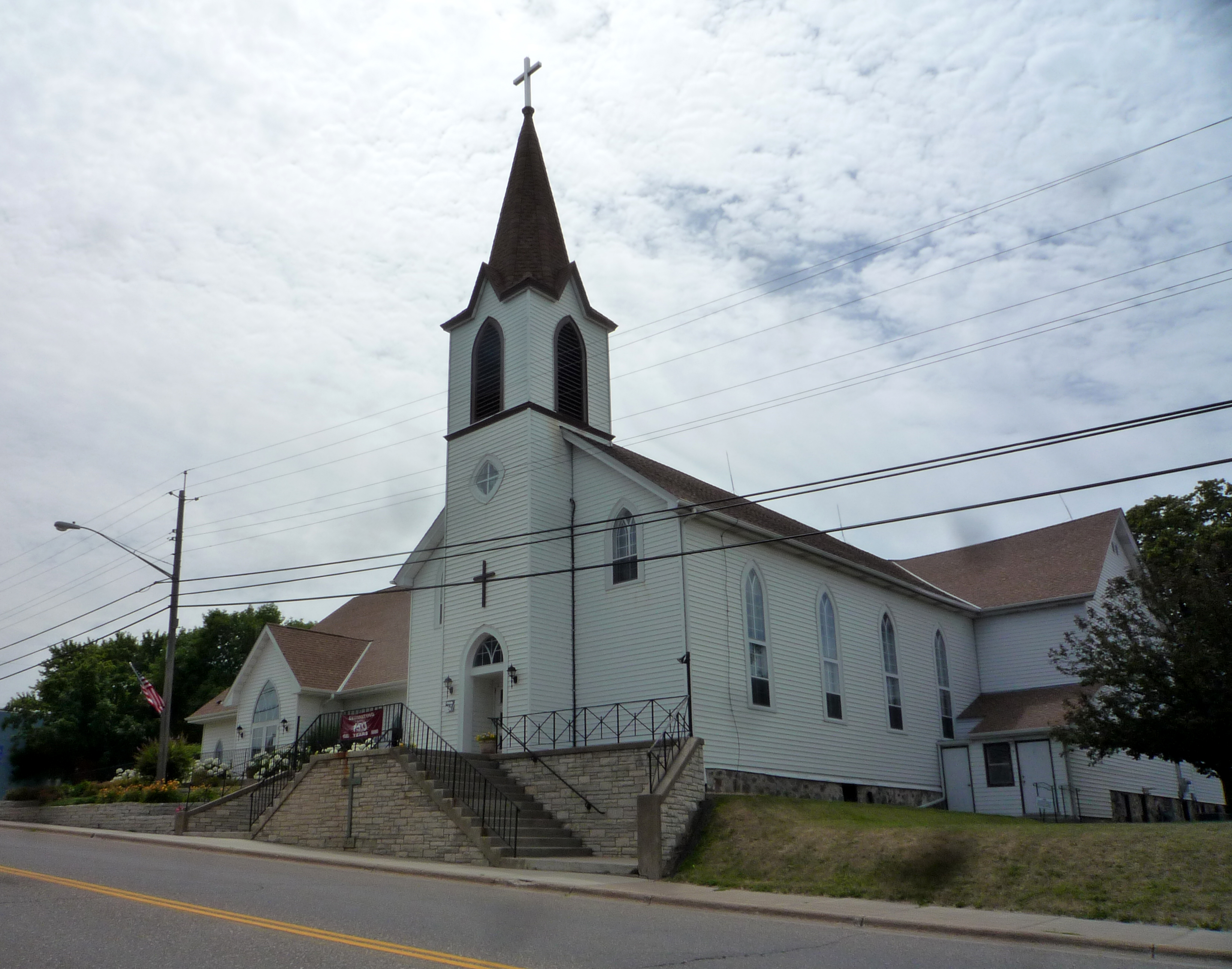
St. Boniface Catholic Church has been in St. Bonifacius for 150 years.

=== 2020 census ===
As of the 2020 census, St. Bonifacius had a population of 2,307. The median age was 39.4 years. 24.8% of residents were under the age of 18 and 12.6% of residents were 65 years of age or older. For every 100 females there were 103.3 males, and for every 100 females age 18 and over there were 103.0 males age 18 and over.

0.0% of residents lived in urban areas, while 100.0% lived in rural areas.

There were 896 households in St. Bonifacius, of which 35.3% had children under the age of 18 living in them. Of all households, 58.7% were married-couple households, 17.1% were households with a male householder and no spouse or partner present, and 16.6% were households with a female householder and no spouse or partner present. About 22.3% of all households were made up of individuals and 7.6% had someone living alone who was 65 years of age or older.

There were 922 housing units, of which 2.8% were vacant. The homeowner vacancy rate was 0.0% and the rental vacancy rate was 7.5%.

Racial composition as of the 2020 census
Race	Number	Percent
White	2,094	90.8%
Black or African American	24	1.0%
American Indian and Alaska Native	13	0.6%
Asian	34	1.5%
Native Hawaiian and Other Pacific Islander	0	0.0%
Some other race	21	0.9%
Two or more races	121	5.2%
Hispanic or Latino (of any race)	67	2.9%

=== 2010 census ===
As of the census of 2010, there were 2,283 people, 863 households, and 624 families living in the city. The population density was 2,153.8 inhabitants per square mile (831.6/km^{2}). There were 912 housing units at an average density of 860.4 per square mile (332.2/km^{2}). The racial makeup of the city was 94.2% White, 1.9% African American, 0.1% Native American, 1.8% Asian, 0.1% Pacific Islander, 0.5% from other races, and 1.4% from two or more races. Hispanic or Latino of any race were 3.2% of the population.

There were 863 households, of which 41.4% had children under the age of 18 living with them, 63.2% were married couples living together, 7.3% had a female householder with no husband present, 1.9% had a male householder with no wife present, and 27.7% were non-families. 20.7% of all households were made up of individuals, and 5.3% had someone living alone who was 65 years of age or older. The average household size was 2.65 and the average family size was 3.12.

The median age in the city was 36.2 years. 28.9% of residents were under the age of 18; 5.2% were between the ages of 18 and 24; 32.1% were from 25 to 44; 25.4% were from 45 to 64; and 8.5% were 65 years of age or older. The gender makeup of the city was 50.9% male and 49.1% female.

=== 2000 census ===
As of the census of 2000, there were 1,873 people, 681 households, and 546 families living in the city. The population density was 1,756.5 inhabitants per square mile (678.2/km^{2}). There were 695 housing units at an average density of 651.8 per square mile (251.7/km^{2}). The racial makeup of the city was 97.01% White, 0.16% African American, 0.11% Native American, 0.91% Asian, 0.59% from other races, and 1.23% from two or more races. Hispanic or Latino of any race were 1.76% of the population.

There were 681 households, out of which 45.1% had children under the age of 18 living with them, 69.8% were married couples living together, 7.0% had a female householder with no husband present, and 19.8% were non-families. 15.0% of all households were made up of individuals, and 3.7% had someone living alone who was 65 years of age or older. The average household size was 2.75 and the average family size was 3.07.

In the city, the population was spread out, with 29.5% under the age of 18, 6.4% from 18 to 24, 41.1% from 25 to 44, 16.7% from 45 to 64, and 6.5% who were 65 years of age or older. The median age was 32 years. For every 100 females, there were 108.1 males. For every 100 females age 18 and over, there were 107.1 males.

The median income for a household in the city was $65,446, and the median income for a family was $69,938. Males had a median income of $43,173 versus $31,354 for females. The per capita income for the city was $24,933. About 2.8% of families and 3.2% of the population were below the poverty line, including 4.8% of those under age 18 and 2.4% of those age 65 or over.

== Politics ==
United States presidential election results for St. Bonifacius, Minnesota
Year	Republican		Democratic		Third party(ies)	
Year	No.	%	No.	%	No.	%
1960	38	11.08%	246	71.72%	59	17.20%
1964	52	17.87%	237	81.44%	2	0.69%
1968	45	15.46%	237	81.44%	9	3.09%
1972	96	32.21%	197	66.11%	5	1.68%
1976	80	22.73%	262	74.43%	10	2.84%
1980	164	35.96%	248	54.39%	44	9.65%
1984	251	53.07%	222	46.93%	0	0.00%
1988	427	53.98%	364	46.02%	0	0.00%
1992	187	32.64%	178	31.06%	208	36.30%
1996	254	36.92%	314	45.64%	120	17.44%
2000	635	59.12%	380	35.38%	59	5.49%
2004	825	62.45%	485	36.71%	11	0.83%
2008	770	56.83%	556	41.03%	29	2.14%
2012	831	60.13%	521	37.70%	30	2.17%
2016	777	58.07%	437	32.66%	124	9.27%
2020	797	55.23%	608	42.13%	38	2.63%
2024	783	54.26%	627	43.45%	33	2.29%

== Education ==
Waconia Public Schools operates the area public schools, including Waconia High School.

Crown College is in a census-designated place in Carver County. It has a St. Bonifacius post office address, but is not in the same county as the city, and is not in the city limits.

== Notable person ==
- Milt Bruhn (1912–1991), American football player and coach
