= Alan Larkin (artist) =

American artist and oil painter

Alan J. Larkin
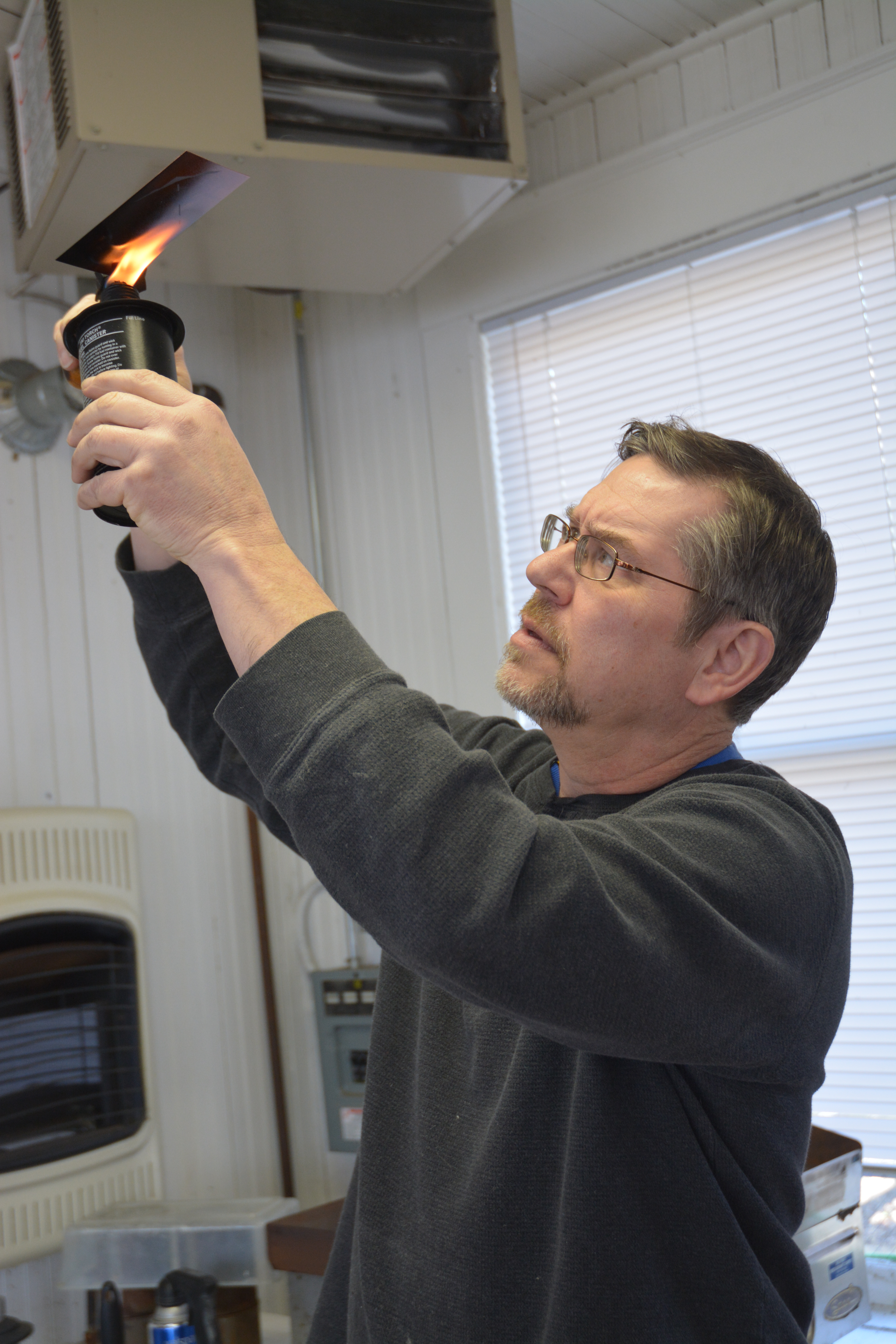
- Larkin working in his studio in 2015
- Born: April 12, 1953 (age 73); Pittsburg, Kansas, United States
- Education: Carleton College (B.A.) Pennsylvania State University (M.F.A)
- Known for: Oil paintings, pastels, woodcut etchings
- Website: alanlarkin.net

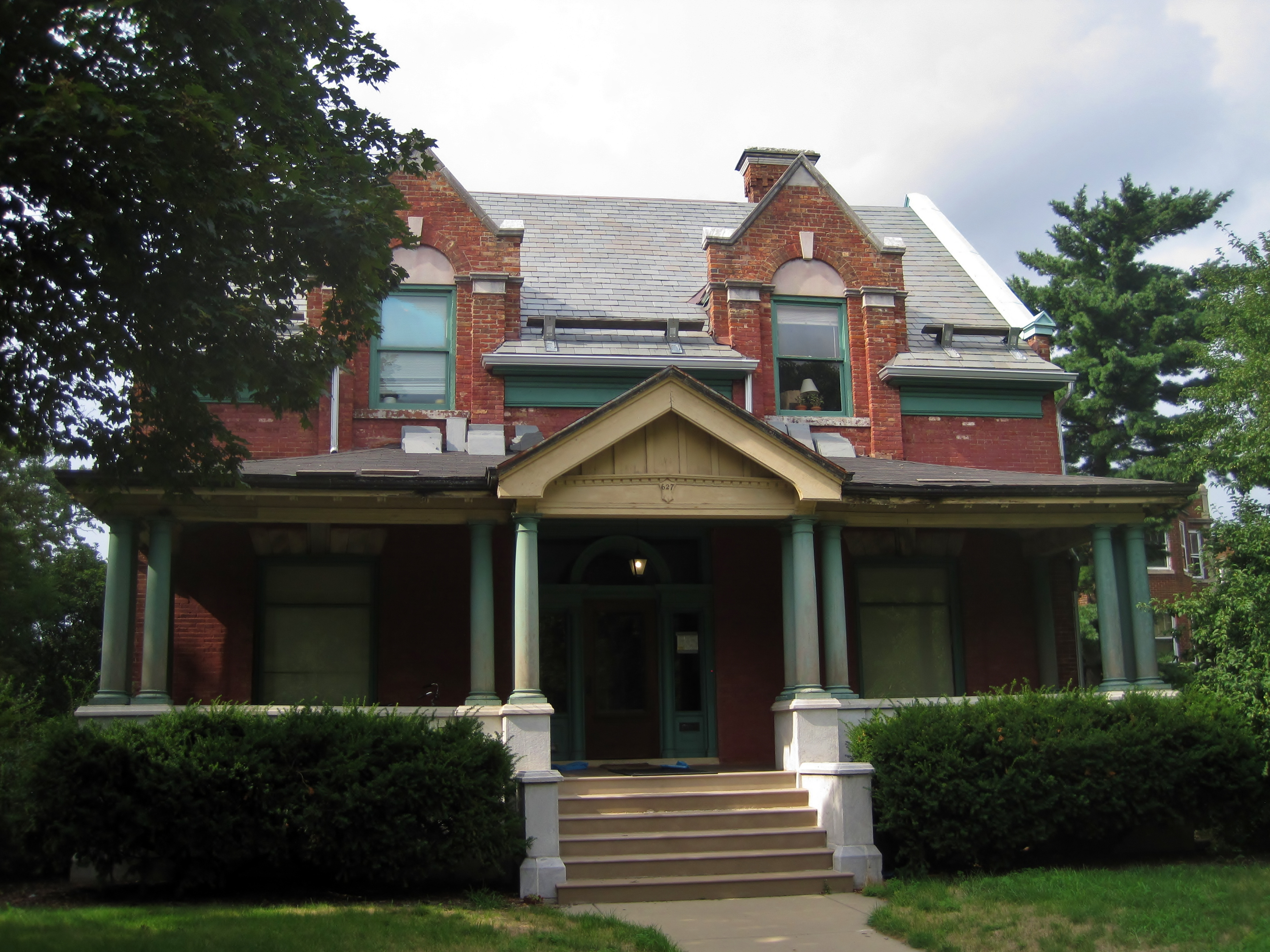
The Peter Studebaker house in South Bend, IN, currently owned by Larkin.

Alan James Larkin is an Indiana based artist from Minnesota who is known for drawing, etching, and oil paintings, and is notable for his still lifes featuring small figurines. He has won Best of Show in the 75th and 91st Hoosier Salon, the 93rd Juried Exhibition of the Indiana Artists Club and is a member of the Brown County Art Guild. Alan was instrumental in founding the Mid American Print Council - a community building educational organization focused on all print related arts - and served as its first President from 1992-1994.

== Biography ==
=== Early life ===
Larkin was born on April 12, 1953 in Pittsburg, Kansas to artist Eugene Larkin and teacher Audrey J. Larkin and moved with his family to Minnesota in his childhood. In 1975 he graduated from Carleton College with a BA in art. In 1977 he earned an MFA from Pennsylvania State University.

=== Career ===
Larkin taught drawing and printmaking at Indiana University South Bend for almost 40 years. In 1991, he convened a group of print-makers to propose an midwestern printmaking organization, which grew into Mid American Print Council. Alan served as the first President from 1992-1994 and today the organization continues to serve regional printmakers through publications, exhibits, professional networking and technical resources.

Larkin has won numerous awards for his art, including the Pastel Journal Founder's Award in the 17th Annual Pastel 100 for his pastel drawing Time Piece in 2016. In 2015 he won the best of show award at the 91st Annual Hoosier Salon Exhibition for his oil painting Alarms and Diversions. In 2022 he won the Drs. Becca & Gus Galante Salon Show Award at the 79th Annual Salon Show award from South Shore Arts. In 2025, Alan was awarded Best In Show for the oil composition, River's Edge Wreath, at the 93rd Annual Juried Exhibition of the Indiana Artists Club, a competition open only to previously juried members.

His work has been the feature of a number of exhibitions. In 2015 a series of his oil and pastel paintings were displayed as a series titled "Through the Looking Glass: The Work of Alan Larkin" through South Shore Arts in Munster, IN. In 2018 his work was featured in an exhibition titled "Voyage: The Art of Alan Larkin" at the South Bend Museum of Art. Larkin's etchings were part of an exhibit at the Birmingham Bloomfield Art Center in Detroit in 2019. In 2021 his etching The Fool was included in the 97th Annual Hoosier Art Salon exhibition. In 2022 his work was featured in the Richmond Art Museum in Richmond, Indiana, in an exhibit titled "Story: The Narrative Art of Alan Larkin". In 2023 Larkin won the Best Printmaking Award for his etching The Major Arcana: The Magician in the 45th Elkhart Juried Regional, hosted by the Midwest Museum of American Art in Elkhart, Indiana.

Larkin's passion for design has crossed over to an interest in historic preservation. He has renovated multiple historic properties on the near west side of South Bend, including the mansion originally built for Peter Studebaker.

== Artistry ==
Larkin works with a variety of media. He largely uses oil or pastel for paintings and etching or lithography for printmaking. Larkin applies gestalt theory in his artwork, saying, "As long as you make sure your painting maintains unity, you can be more adventurous." Drawing is central to his work and is a persistent source of satisfaction for him as an artist. He continues to teach drawing by conducting "Drawing Bootcamps" to experienced artists. Some of his signature scenes involve still life compositions featuring small figurines.
