= New Germany, Minnesota =

City in Minnesota, United States

- City
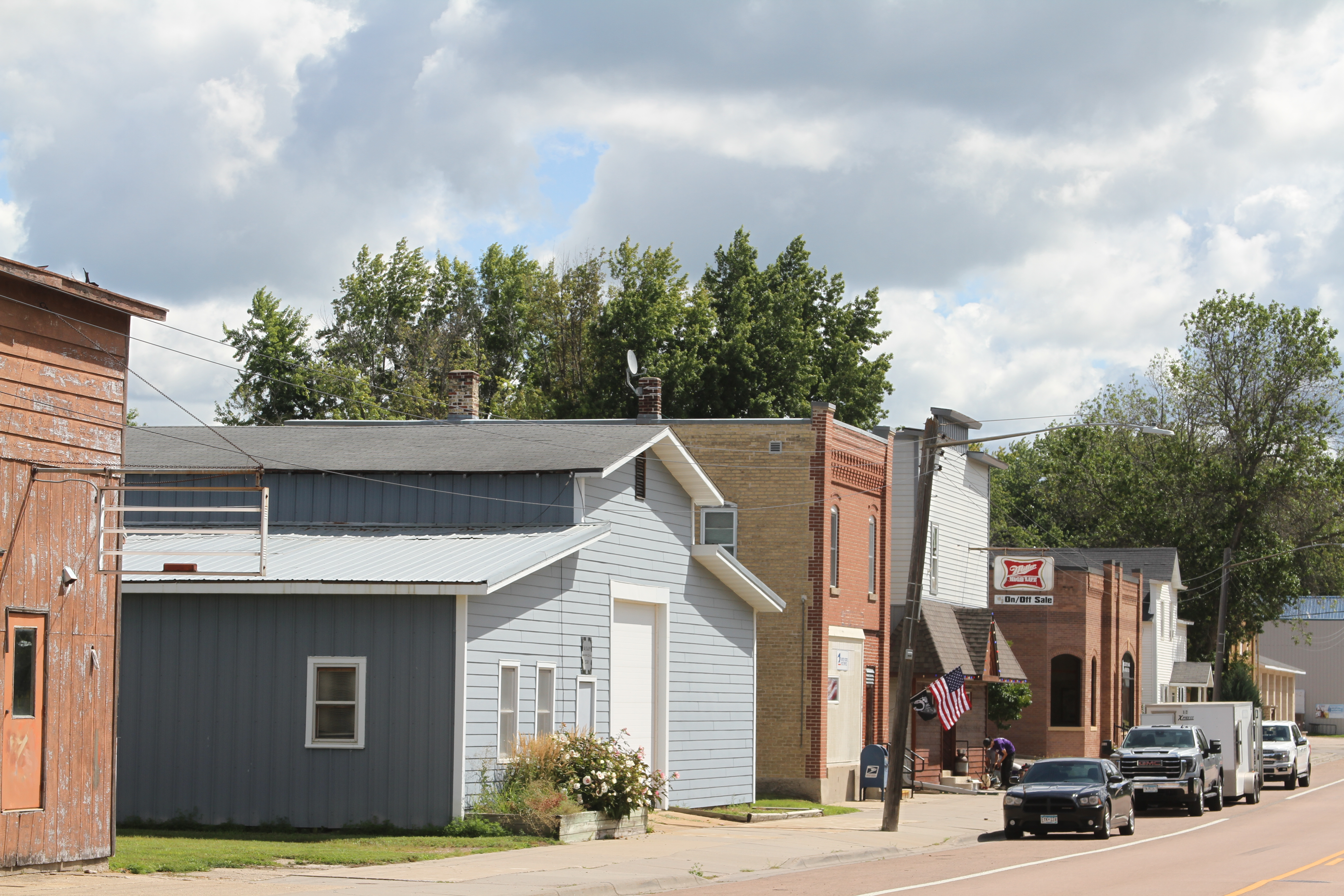
- E. Broadway Street

- Location of the city of New Germany within Carver County, Minnesota
- Coordinates: 44°52′49″N 93°58′20″W
- Country: United States
- State: Minnesota
- County: Carver

Area
  - Total: 1.00 sq mi (2.59 km^{2})
  - Land: 1.00 sq mi (2.58 km^{2})
  - Water: 0.0077 sq mi (0.02 km^{2})
- Elevation: 974 ft (297 m)

Population (2020)
  - Total: 464
  - Density: 466.6/sq mi (180.16/km^{2})
- Time zone: UTC-6 (Central (CST))
  - Summer (DST): UTC-5 (CDT)
- ZIP code: 55367
- Area code: 952
- FIPS code: 27-45556
- GNIS feature ID: 2395195
- Website: http://cityofnewgermany.com/

New Germany is a city in Carver County, Minnesota, United States. As of the 2020 census, New Germany had a population of 464. A large proportion of the early settlers being natives of Germany caused the name to be selected.

== History ==
New Germany was established in the 1880s around the Great Northern Railroad depot. Its first post office, however, was moved onto the area from a different site and kept the original name of Purity. The post office name was not changed to match the railroad and community name until 1902. New Germany incorporated as a village in 1901 in Camden Township and separated as a city under Minnesota law in 1974. In 1917 during World War I, the village changed its name to Motordale. It restored the name New Germany in 1922.

== Geography ==
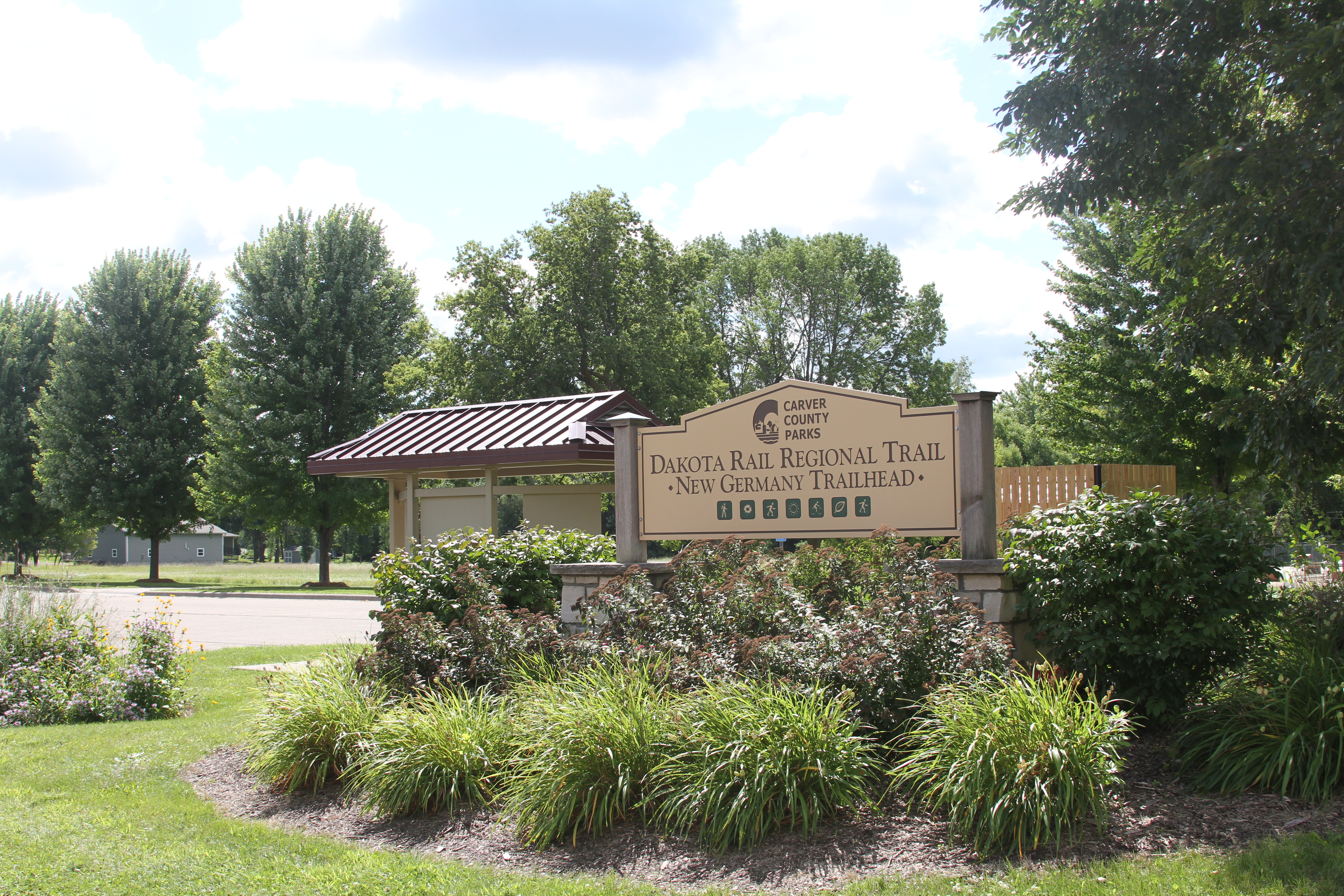
Dakota Rail Regional Trail

According to the United States Census Bureau, the city has a total area of 1.00 square mile (2.59 km^{2}), all land.

County Roads 30 and 33 are two of the main routes in the community. Minnesota State Highway 7 is in proximity to the city.

New Germany borders the Lake Minnetonka LRT Regional Trail.

== Demographics ==
Historical population
| Census | Pop. | Note | %± |
|---|---|---|---|
| 1910 | 210 | | — |
| 1920 | 230 | | 9.5% |
| 1930 | 209 | | −9.1% |
| 1940 | 247 | | 18.2% |
| 1950 | 286 | | 15.8% |
| 1960 | 274 | | −4.2% |
| 1970 | 303 | | 10.6% |
| 1980 | 347 | | 14.5% |
| 1990 | 353 | | 1.7% |
| 2000 | 346 | | −2.0% |
| 2010 | 372 | | 7.5% |
| 2020 | 464 | | 24.7% |
U.S. Decennial Census

=== 2010 census ===
As of the census of 2010, there were 372 people, 146 households, and 99 families living in the city. The population density was 372.0 inhabitants per square mile (143.6/km^{2}). There were 168 housing units at an average density of 168.0 per square mile (64.9/km^{2}). The racial makeup of the city was 96.0% White, 0.3% Asian, 2.7% from other races, and 1.1% from two or more races. Hispanic or Latino of any race were 7.3% of the population.

There were 146 households, of which 37.7% had children under the age of 18 living with them, 52.1% were married couples living together, 8.2% had a female householder with no husband present, 7.5% had a male householder with no wife present, and 32.2% were non-families. 26.0% of all households were made up of individuals, and 8.2% had someone living alone who was 65 years of age or older. The average household size was 2.55 and the average family size was 3.09.

The median age in the city was 34.4 years. 29.3% of residents were under the age of 18; 4.7% were between the ages of 18 and 24; 32.3% were from 25 to 44; 23.7% were from 45 to 64; and 10.2% were 65 years of age or older. The gender makeup of the city was 51.3% male and 48.7% female.

=== 2000 census ===
As of the census of 2000, there were 346 people, 143 households, and 94 families living in the city. The population density was 528.9 inhabitants per square mile (204.2/km^{2}). There were 147 housing units at an average density of 224.7 per square mile (86.8/km^{2}). The racial makeup of the city was 97.69% White, 2 African Americans, 1 Native American, and 3 from two or more races.

There were 143 households, out of which 27.3% had children under the age of 18 living with them, 55.9% were married couples living together, 5.6% had a female householder with no husband present, and 33.6% were non-families. 32.2% of all households were made up of individuals, and 19.6% had someone living alone who was 65 years of age or older. The average household size was 2.42 and the average family size was 2.98.

In the city, the population was spread out, with 23.7% under the age of 18, 7.5% from 18 to 24, 31.8% from 25 to 44, 17.9% from 45 to 64, and 19.1% who were 65 years of age or older. The median age was 37 years. For every 100 females, there were 87.0 males. For every 100 females age 18 and over, there were 94.1 males.

The median income for a household in the city was $36,094, and the median income for a family was $45,625. Males had a median income of $29,750 versus $24,545 for females. The per capita income for the city was $16,314. About 9.5% of families and 14.4% of the population were below the poverty line, including 17.5% of those under age 18 and 33.8% of those age 65 or over.

== Politics ==
Presidential election results

2020 PRECINCT RESULTS SPREADSHEET2016 PRECINCT RESULTS SPREADSHEET2012 PRECINCT RESULTS SPREADSHEET2008 PRECINCT RESULTS SPREADSHEET2004 PRECINCT RESULTS SPREADSHEET + 2000 PRECINCT RESULTS SPREADSHEET
| Year | Republican | Democratic | Third parties |
|---|---|---|---|
| 2020 | 79.4% 193 | 19.3% 47 | 1.3% 3 |
| 2016 | 74.8% 148 | 15.2% 30 | 10.0% 20 |
| 2012 | 64.9% 124 | 31.9% 61 | 3.2% 6 |
| 2008 | 63.2% 110 | 31.6% 55 | 5.5% 9 |
| 2004 | 66.9% 121 | 30.9% 56 | 2.2% 4 |
| 2000 | 68.9% 111 | 23.6% 38 | 7.5% 12 |

== Education ==
Waconia Public Schools operates the area public schools, including Waconia High School.

== Notable people ==
- Dicephalic conjoined twins Abigail and Brittany Hensel (born 1990) are from New Germany.
