= Robert L. Searles =

American politician (1919–2004)

Robert Lippincott Searles (April 17, 1919 – May 26, 2004) was an American businessman and politician.

Searles lived in Wayzata, Minnesota, with his wife Jessie and family, and was involved in the grain marketing business. He served in the United States Navy during World War II. Searles graduated from Princeton University with a bachelor's degree in psychology. He served on the Orono, Minnesota City Council and as Mayor of Orono from 1963 to 1976. Searles also served on the Orono Planning Commission from 1955 to 1963 and on the Lake Minnetonka Conservation District Conservation District from 1968 to 1976. Searles served in the Minnesota House of Representatives, while living in Wayzata, from 1977 to 1982 and was a Republican.
