= Charles Pillsbury (attorney) =

American lawyer

- Born: October 5, 1947 (age 79); Minneapolis, Minnesota, U.S.
- Education: St. Paul's School
- Alma mater: Yale University; Boston University School of Law
- Occupations: Attorney, politician
- Relatives: Winston Lord (second cousin)

Charles A. Pillsbury is a mediator, lawyer, and community activist in New Haven, Connecticut, where he is the co-director of the Center on Dispute Resolution at Quinnipiac University School of Law. He also served as the first executive director of Mediators Beyond Borders International from November 1, 2009, through January 31, 2014. He is the great-grandson of Charles Alfred Pillsbury, founder of the Pillsbury Company in 1872. He is also the source of the part of the surname (and some perceived character traits) of the comic strip character Mike Doonesbury, created by Pillsbury's college roommate, Garry Trudeau.

== Early life ==
Pillsbury was born on October 5, 1947, in Minneapolis, Minnesota, the son of George Sturgis Pillsbury and Sally Lucille (Whitney) Pillsbury. He attended boarding school at St. Paul's School, graduating in 1965 as the school's "scholar-athlete". In October 2015, he publicly disclosed through a Hartford Courant op-ed that he was sexually abused as a student there. He received his B.A. from Yale University in 1972 and his J.D. from Boston University School of Law in 1975.

== Career ==
Pillsbury practiced law from 1975 to 1989. He served as the executive director of Community Mediation, Inc. from 1989 to 2009, and of Mediators Beyond Borders International from 2009 to 2014 He has served as the co-director of the Center on Dispute Resolution at the Quinnipiac University School of Law since 2013.

Pillsbury became actively involved in politics when he worked on the presidential campaign of Democrat Eugene McCarthy in 1968 in New Hampshire. This surprised some because his father, George, was a Republican state senator and was actively supporting Richard Nixon, and because his uncle, Wheelock Whitney Jr., had previously run against Eugene McCarthy for U.S. Senate in 1964.

== Political campaigns ==
=== 2002 ===
Pillsbury ran for United States Congress as a Green Party candidate in Connecticut's 3rd congressional district in 2002. He received 9,050 votes, for 4.9% of the total vote.

=== 2010 ===
Pillsbury challenged Democratic incumbent Rosa DeLauro in Connecticut's 3rd congressional district. Connecticut Republican Party treasurer Jerry Labriola Jr. also ran. DeLauro was re-elected to another term.

== Personal life ==
Pillsbury is married to the Rev. Allie Perry. (He has four children by his former wife, Jean Sanderson.) They live in New Haven, Connecticut.
