= Crystal Bay, Minnesota =

Unincorporated community in Minnesota, United States

- unincorporated community
- Location within Minnesota
- Coordinates: 44°57′11″N 93°34′35″W
- Country: United States
- State: Minnesota
- County: Hennepin
- Elevation: 958 ft (292 m)
- Time zone: UTC-6 (Central (CST))
  - Summer (DST): UTC-5 (CDT)
- ZIP code: 55323
- Area code: 952
- GNIS feature ID: 640969

Crystal Bay is an unincorporated community in Orono, Hennepin County, Minnesota, United States. It is a farming community with many of these hobby farms having been owned by the wealthy of Minneapolis. Crystal Bay has its own post office with ZIP code 55323.
