= Excelsior =

Excelsior may refer to:

== Arts and entertainment ==
=== Literature and poetry ===
- "Excelsior" (Longfellow), an 1841 poem by Henry Wadsworth Longfellow
- "Excelsior", an 1877 picture book in verse by Bret Harte, published as an advertisement for the Sapolio soap brand
- Excelsior!: The Amazing Life of Stan Lee, a 2002 biography by Stan Lee and George Mair
- Excelsior (Macedonski), a book of poems by Alexandru Macedonski
- Excelsior: Forged in Fire, a 2007 Star Trek novel by Andy Mangels and Michael A. Martin
- Excelsior, a 1928 novella by Paul Morand
- Excelsior, a 1988 novel by Randall Silvis
- The Excelsior, a 1919 novel by H. B. Marriott Watson
- "Excelsior" (short story), 1948, by P. G. Wodehouse
- "Excelsior" (Whitman), a poem by Walt Whitman

=== Music ===
- Excelsior Recordings, a record label from the Netherlands
- Excelsior Brass Band, an 1879-1931 brass band from New Orleans
- "Excelsior", a setting of Longfellow's poem to music by Michael William Balfe
- "Excelsior!", a concert overture by Wilhelm Stenhammar
- Excelsior (Steven Page album), 2022
- Excelsior (Slauson Malone 1 album), 2023
- "Excelsior", a song by the Smashing Pumpkins from Atum: A Rock Opera in Three Acts, 2023

=== Science fiction ===
- Excelsior (comics), in Runaways, a support group for former teenage superheroes
- USS Excelsior, a Federation starship first seen in the movie Star Trek III: The Search for Spock

=== Journals and newspapers ===
- Excélsior, a newspaper published in Mexico City
- Daily Excelsior, a newspaper published in Jammu and Kashmir

=== Other arts and entertainment ===
- Excelsior!, 1901 short film
- TV Excelsior, a defunct Brazilian television network
- Excelsior, an 1881 ballet by Luigi Manzotti
- Excelsior Wet Plate Camera, an early camera model used in the collodion process of photography

== Mottos and catchphrases ==
- "Excelsior" (motto), official motto of the state of New York
- "Excelsior!", catchphrase of Stan Lee, who often used it at the end of his "Stan's Soapbox" column in Marvel Comics
- "Excelsior", sign-off of Detroit radio personality Mark Scott
- "Excelsior", motto of the Finnish Army's Special Jaegers
- "Excelsior", mantra of Patrizio "Pat" Solitano, Jr. in the 2012 film Silver Linings Playbook
- "Excelsior!", motto of the fictional Weldon Institute in Jules Verne's Robur the Conqueror
- "Excelsior!", one of the catchphrases of Martin Prince, Jr., a recurring character in The Simpsons
- "Excelsior, you fathead!", a catchphrase of former radio personality Jean Shepherd

== Sports ==
=== Association football ===
- Excelsior '31, Rijssen, Netherlands
- Excelsior AC, a Haitian association football club
- Excelsior AC Roubaix, a French association football club
- Excelsior Maassluis, a football club from Maassluis, Netherlands
- Excelsior Mouscron, a former Belgian association football club
- Excelsior Rotterdam, a Dutch association football club
- Excelsior Stadium, the home of Airdrie United F.C. of the Scottish Football League Second Division
- AS Excelsior, an association football club from Saint-Joseph, Réunion Island
- Birmingham Excelsior F.C., a defunct English association football club
- F.C. Excelsior, Mexican football club that plays in the Segunda División Profesional
- SV Excelsior, a Surinamese association football club
- SS Excelsior (football club), a club from Réunion Island established in 1940

=== Other sports ===
- Excelsior Stakes previously the Excelsior Handicap, an American Thoroughbred horse race held annually
- Excelsior Rugby Club, an amateur rugby club in New Zealand
- Excelsior of Brooklyn, an amateur baseball team that played in Brooklyn, New York
- New York Excelsior, an American professional Overwatch eSports team based in New York City, New York
- Brampton Excelsiors (disambiguation)

== Schools ==
- Excelsior Academy, in Newcastle upon Tyne, England
- Excelsior College, in Albany, New York
- Excelsior, a common high school and grammar school name:
  - Excelsior High School (Norwalk, California) (1903–1981)
  - Excelsior Public School (Excelsior, Minnesota) (1904–1964)
  - Excelsior School, a non-denominational school in Pasadena, California
  - Excelsior High School, Washougal, Washington

== Hotels and restaurants ==
- Excelsior (restaurant), a former restaurant in Hotel de l'Europe, Amsterdam
- Excelsior, a common hotel name:
  - Hotel Excelsior, Berlin (1908–1945)
  - Hôtel Excelsior, Casablanca (est. 1916)
  - Excelsior Hotel Ernst, Cologne (est. 1863)
  - The Excelsior (Hong Kong), a former hotel in Causeway Bay, Hong Kong

== Places ==
=== Canada ===
- Excelsior, Alberta
- Rural Municipality of Excelsior No. 166, Saskatchewan

=== South Africa ===
- Excelsior, Free State

=== United States ===
- Excelsior, California, former name of Meadow Lake, Nevada County, California
- Excelsior, Georgia
- Excelsior (Oak Ridge, Louisiana)
- Excelsior, Minnesota
- Excelsior, Missouri
- Excelsior, Atchison County, Missouri
- Excelsior, Nevada
- Excelsior, West Virginia (disambiguation)
  - Excelsior, McDowell County, West Virginia
  - Excelsior, Upshur County, West Virginia
  - Excelsior, Webster County, West Virginia
- Excelsior, Wisconsin (disambiguation)
  - Excelsior, Richland County, Wisconsin
  - Excelsior, Sauk County, Wisconsin
- The Excelsior District, San Francisco, a neighborhood in San Francisco, California
- Excelsior Geyser in the Middle Geyser Basin of Yellowstone National Park, Wyoming
- Excelsior Mountain (Yosemite), in Yosemite National Park
- Excelsior Mountains, in western Nevada in the US
- Excelsior Springs, Missouri
- Excelsior Township, Michigan

== Transportation ==
- Excelsior-Henderson Motorcycle (Belle Plaine, MN), founded in 1993
- Excelsior Motor Manufacturing & Supply Company (Chicago, IL), a U.S. motorcycle manufacturer operating in Chicago from 1907 to 1931
  - Henderson Motorcycle, a division of the above company from 1919 to 1931
  - Excelsior Super X, a motorcycle made by the above company from 1925 to 1931
- Motorwagenfabrik Excelsior, a Swiss car maker in business between 1896 and 1919
- Compagnie Nationale Excelsior, a Belgian car manufacturer existing between 1904 and 1932
- Excelsior Motor Company, a British bicycle, motorcycle and car maker
  - Excelsior Manxman, a motorcycle made by the above company
- Xcelsior (bus), a transit bus manufactured by New Flyer Industries
- Excelsior tank, a British experimental heavy assault tank
- St Croix Excelsior, ultralight aircraft
- Excelsior, a prototype Spaceship Neptune high altitude balloon gondola by Space Perspective
- Excelsior (smack), the last surviving fishing smack of the Lowestoft fishing fleet and a member of the National Historic Fleet
- SS Excelsior (ship), one of several steam-powered ships named Excelsior

== Nature ==
- Fraxinus excelsior, the scientific name for the European ash tree
- Excelsior eight-eight (Callicore excelsior), a butterfly of the family Nymphalidae found in South America
- Acraea excelsior, a butterfly of the family Nymphalidae found in eastern Africa

== Typefaces ==
- "Excelsior", the American term for a three-point font size
- Excelsior (typeface), a serif typeface well-suited to newsprint

== Other uses ==
- Excelsior (chess problem), by Sam Loyd
- Excelsior Amusement Park, located on Lake Minnetonka in the town of Excelsior, Minnesota
- Excelsior Brigade, a New York infantry brigade in the Union Army in the American Civil War
- Excelsior Diamond, a famous diamond, once the largest known
- Excelsior JET, a Java compiler
- Project Excelsior, a high-altitude skydiving project in the 1950s
- Wood wool, commonly known as excelsior, a packing material

== See also ==
- Excel (disambiguation)
- Excelsia College
