= Benton Township, Missouri =

Benton Township, Missouri may refer to one of the following 14 places in the State of Missouri:

- Benton Township, Adair County, Missouri
- Benton Township, Andrew County, Missouri
- Benton Township, Atchison County, Missouri
- Benton Township, Cedar County, Missouri
- Benton Township, Crawford County, Missouri
- Benton Township, Daviess County, Missouri
- Benton Township, Douglas County, Missouri
- Benton Township, Holt County, Missouri
- Benton Township, Howell County, Missouri
- Benton Township, Knox County, Missouri
- Benton Township, Linn County, Missouri
- Benton Township, Newton County, Missouri
- Benton Township, Osage County, Missouri
- Benton Township, Wayne County, Missouri

== See also ==
- Benton Township (disambiguation)
