= Benton Township =

Benton Township may refer to:

== Arkansas ==
- Benton Township, Faulkner County, Arkansas
- Benton Township, Fulton County, Arkansas

== Illinois ==
- Benton Township, Franklin County, Illinois
- Benton Township, Lake County, Illinois

== Indiana ==
- Benton Township, Elkhart County, Indiana
- Benton Township, Monroe County, Indiana

== Iowa ==
- Benton Township, Benton County, Iowa
- Benton Township, Cass County, Iowa
- Benton Township, Des Moines County, Iowa
- Benton Township, Fremont County, Iowa
- Benton Township, Keokuk County, Iowa
- Benton Township, Lucas County, Iowa
- Benton Township, Ringgold County, Iowa
- Benton Township, Taylor County, Iowa
- Benton Township, Wayne County, Iowa

== Kansas ==
- Benton Township, Atchison County, Kansas
- Benton Township, Butler County, Kansas
- Benton Township, Hodgeman County, Kansas

== Michigan ==
- Benton Charter Township, Michigan
- Benton Township, Cheboygan County, Michigan
- Benton Township, Eaton County, Michigan

== Minnesota ==
- Benton Township, Minnesota

== Missouri ==
- Benton Township, Adair County, Missouri
- Benton Township, Andrew County, Missouri
- Benton Township, Atchison County, Missouri
- Benton Township, Cedar County, Missouri
- Benton Township, Crawford County, Missouri
- Benton Township, Daviess County, Missouri
- Benton Township, Douglas County, Missouri
- Benton Township, Holt County, Missouri
- Benton Township, Howell County, Missouri
- Benton Township, Knox County, Missouri
- Benton Township, Linn County, Missouri
- Benton Township, Newton County, Missouri, in Newton County, Missouri
- Benton Township, Osage County, Missouri
- Benton Township, Wayne County, Missouri

== Ohio ==
- Benton Township, Hocking County, Ohio
- Benton Township, Monroe County, Ohio
- Benton Township, Ottawa County, Ohio
- Benton Township, Paulding County, Ohio
- Benton Township, Pike County, Ohio

== Pennsylvania ==
- Benton Township, Columbia County, Pennsylvania
- Benton Township, Lackawanna County, Pennsylvania

== South Dakota ==
- Benton Township, McCook County, South Dakota, in McCook County, South Dakota
- Benton Township, Minnehaha County, South Dakota, in Minnehaha County, South Dakota
- Benton Township, Spink County, South Dakota, in Spink County, South Dakota

== See also ==
- Benton (disambiguation)
