= Excel (disambiguation) =

Excel is a spreadsheet program by Microsoft Corporation.

Excel may also refer to:

== Companies ==
- Excel Airways
- Excel Communications, a telephone company in Irving, Texas
- Excel Entertainment Pvt. Ltd., a film studio based in Mumbai, India
- Excel mobile phones
- Excel Records, a record label
- Excel, a division of Cargill Meat Solutions

== Places ==
- Excel, Alabama, a town in the United States
- EXCEL High School, a public secondary school in Oakland, California
- ExCeL London (Exhibition Centre London), England
- Excel, Alberta, a locality in Canada
- Excel No. 71, Saskatchewan, a rural municipality in Saskatchewan, Canada
- Excel Township, Marshall County, Minnesota

== Vehicles ==
=== Aircraft ===
- Cessna Citation Excel, an American midsize business jet
- Edel Excel, a South Korean paraglider design
- Europe Sails Excel, an Austrian hang glider

=== Road vehicles ===
- Excel (automobile), a 1914 American cyclecar
- Hyundai Excel, a 1985–1999 South Korean subcompact car
- Lotus Excel, a 1982–1992 British sports car
- Optare Excel, a 1995–2004 British low-floor single-decker bus

=== Ships ===
- USS Excel (AM-94), a minesweeper launched in 1942
- USS Excel (AM-439), a minesweeper launched in 1953

== Other uses ==
- Excel (gum), a brand of chewing gum produced by Wrigley's
- Excel (band), a thrash-punk band from Venice, California
- Excel (Excel Saga), a character in Excel Saga
- Excel, a 6-row malting barley variety

== See also ==
- Edexcel
- Excell
- Excellent (disambiguation)
- Excelsior (disambiguation)
- USS Excel, a list of ships of the U.S. Navy
- Xcel Energy
- XL (disambiguation)
