= Imko Binnerts =

Imko Binnerts can refer to

- Imko Binnerts - head chef, formerly been awarded a Michelin star for the restaurants Excelsior, Imko's and Imko Binnerts (restaurant)
- Imko Binnerts (restaurant) - former Michelin starred restaurant
