= Excelsior Mountain =

Excelsior Mountain can refer to

- Excelsior Mountain (Yosemite) in California, U.S.
- Excelsior Mountain (Alberta) in the Maligne Range in Canada
- Excelsior Mountain of the North Cascades in Washington state, U.S.
- Excelsior Mountains in Nevada, U.S.

== See also ==
- Excelsior (disambiguation)#Places
