= Crypto-trading hamster =

Pet hamster

Mr. Goxx
- Mr. Goxx in his enclosure, with "Buy" and "Sell" tunnels
- Other names: Max, Crypto-trading hamster
- Species: Hamster
- Breed: Syrian Hamster
- Born: Germany
- Died: November 26th 2021

The crypto-trading hamster, also known as Mr. Goxx, was a hamster that selected cryptocurrencies to buy or sell on a trading platform. The hamster used his hamster wheel to "choose" cryptocurrencies, and two tunnels marked "Buy" and "Sell" were electronically wired to complete trades when he ran through them. Mr. Goxx died on 26 November 2021.

The hamster was owned by a German lecturer and prototyping specialist in his 30s who reconnected with his best friend since university during COVID-19 lockdowns. Together, they coded the hamster a system which linked to a real cryptocurrency portfolio on an online trading platform, calling the project "Goxx Capital". The pair opted to remain anonymous due to controversy related to the crypto market. They created a Twitter and Twitch account for the hamster where the latest news and decisions were shared, and livestreams were announced with the notification "Mr. Goxx is in the office".

Mr. Goxx placed his first order on 12 June, placing a £278 order for XLM. Over the first month, Goxx Capital was down 7.3%, and 95 orders had been placed. It then was up 19% by September. In September 2021, his performance was reported as being up about 20%, beating many human investors.

They were inspired to create the hamster's crypto trading tools because they felt young people were making uninformed cryptocurrency decisions due to the difficulty of building savings. They said to the BBC, "We were joking about whether my hamster would be able to make smarter investment decisions than we humans do." They named the hamster Mr. Goxx after the Mt. Gox crypto scandal in which hundreds of thousands of Bitcoin were stolen from the Japanese crypto exchange platform.

== See also ==
- Jill Insley § Investment cat
