= Excelsior, Nevada =

- Ghost Town
- Location within the state of Nevada
- Coordinates: 41°42′16″N 116°10′08″W
- Country: United States
- State: Nevada
- County: Elko
- Elevation: 6,306 ft (1,922 m)
- Time zone: UTC-8 (Pacific (PST))
  - Summer (DST): UTC-7 (PDT)

Excelsior is a ghost town in Elko County, in the U.S. state of Nevada.

== Geography ==
The site of Excelsior is near the junction of Nevada State Route 226 and Spanish Ranch Road, at 41°42′16″N 116°10′08″W.

== History ==
The Cope Mining District was formed in 1869. The Excelsior Mine was one of the principal mines of this district, the other being the El Dorado Mine.

Excelsior was a mining community of approximately 20 men at its peak. Only a couple of frame buildings were built before the site was abandoned. A post office called Excelsior was in operation from 1871 until 1872. Aaron Van Ulick was the first and only postmaster. Upon the post office's March 12, 1872, closure, mail was routed through nearby White Rock.

The mine at Excelsior was an ore mine; the mine closed in 1873. The closure of the Excelsior mine had a major impact in the region, helping to cause an exodus in nearby Mountain City by 1875.

The site today is marked by a few dugouts; no houses remain.

== See also ==
- Bull Run Mountains
- List of ghost towns in the United States
