= Exell =

Exell is a surname. Notable people with the surname include:

- Arthur Wallis Exell (1901–1993), British botanist and cryptographer
- Boyd Exell (born 1972), Australian horse driver, trainer, and equestrian judge
- Gavin Exell (born 1962), Australian rules footballer
- Joseph Exell (fl. 1880–1919), editor of The Pulpit Commentary

== See also ==
- Excell
