= SS Excelsior =

SS Excelsior may refer to:

- SS Excelsior (football club), a club from Réunion Island established in 1940
- SS Excelsior (ship), one of several steam-powered ships named Excelsior
