= Benton Township, Illinois =

Benton Township, Illinois refers to one of the following places:

- Benton Township, Franklin County, Illinois
- Benton Township, Lake County, Illinois

See also

- Benton Township (disambiguation)
