= Benton Township, Michigan =

Benton Township is the name of some places in the U.S. state of Michigan:

- Benton Charter Township, Michigan, in Berrien County
- Benton Township, Cheboygan County, Michigan
- Benton Township, Eaton County, Michigan

== See also ==
- Benton Township (disambiguation)
