= Excell =

Excell is a surname. Notable people with the surname include:

- E. O. Excell (1851–1921), American publisher and composer
- Peter Excell (1948–2020), British engineer, scientist, and researcher
- Sidney Excell (1906–1990), British Army officer during World War II

== See also ==
- Excel (disambiguation)
