= Benton Township, Indiana =

Benton Township is the name of two townships in the U.S. state of Indiana:

- Benton Township, Elkhart County, Indiana
- Benton Township, Monroe County, Indiana

== See also ==
- Benton Township (disambiguation)
