= Excelsior, West Virginia =

Excelsior is the name of several unincorporated communities in the U.S. state of West Virginia.

- Excelsior, McDowell County, West Virginia
- Excelsior, Upshur County, West Virginia
- Excelsior, Webster County, West Virginia
