= White Rock, Nevada =

- Ghost town
- Location within Nevada Location within the United States
- Coordinates: 41°44′31″N 116°11′10″W
- Country: United States
- State: Nevada
- County: Elko
- Elevation: 5,710 ft (1,740 m)

White Rock is an extinct town in Elko County, in the U.S. state of Nevada.

White Rock was located on the western side of the Bull Run Mountains.

== History ==
The community was named for the white hills near the original town site. A post office was in operation at White Rock from 1871 until 1925. Variant names were "White Rock City" and "Whiterock".
