= Excelsior, Atchison County, Missouri =

Extinct hamlet in Missouri, U.S.

Excelsior
- Company Town
- Coordinates: 40°19′27″N 95°37′20″W
- Country: United States
- State: Missouri
- County: Atchison
- Township: Benton
- Founded: 1857
- Movement of Wheel Mill: 1867
- Named for: The Excelsior Wheel Mill

Excelsior is an extinct hamlet in Atchison County, in the U.S. state of Missouri. The GNIS classifies it as a populated place. It was founded in 1857. It was located in the southwest section of Benton Township section 21.

The community took its name from the Excelsior Wheel Mill on the Missouri River. Besides the mill, the community contained a schoolhouse.

In 1869, the Excelsior wheel took the place of an overshot mill in section 33 of Benton Township, and eight years afterwards, in 1877, a turbine wheel was added. The average grinding capacity of this mill was eighty bushels per day with the new mill at that location. Nothing remains at the original location where the wheel was removed, leaving only a dilapidated frame of the wheel house as reported in 1881.

Another source suggests the mill was removed to Nebraska as early as 1867.
