= XLM =

XLM may refer to:

- Stellar Lumens cryptocurrency
- Microsoft Excel macro
- Xen Loadable Module
- Saint-Lambert station, by IATA code

== See also ==
- XML
- XL (disambiguation)
