= Imko Binnerts (restaurant) =

Coordinates: 52°2′17.38″N 4°19′25.93″E

- Interactive map of Imko Binnerts

Restaurant information
- Established: 2004
- Closed: 2006
- Head chef: Imko Binnerts
- Location: Generaal Eisenhowerplein 1, Rijswijk, 2288 AE, Netherlands

Imko Binnerts is a defunct restaurant located in the Grand Winston Hotel in Rijswijk, Netherlands. It was a fine dining restaurant that was awarded one Michelin star in both 2005 and 2006.

Head chef of the restaurant was Imko Binnerts. He is a chef specializing in fresh fish and seafood. Binnerts left the restaurant in 2006, because he was not feeling in the right spot. He moved to "Schmidt Zeevis", a major fish supplier in Rotterdam.

Before starting as an employee at the Grand Winston Hotel, he had his own restaurant Imko's in IJmuiden that went bankrupt in 2004.

== See also ==
- List of Michelin starred restaurants in the Netherlands
