= Excelsior, Wisconsin =

Excelsior, Wisconsin may refer to:

- Excelsior, Richland County, Wisconsin, an unincorporated community in Richland County
- Excelsior, Sauk County, Wisconsin, a town in Sauk County
