= Martha Sheldon =

American medical missionary (1860-1912)

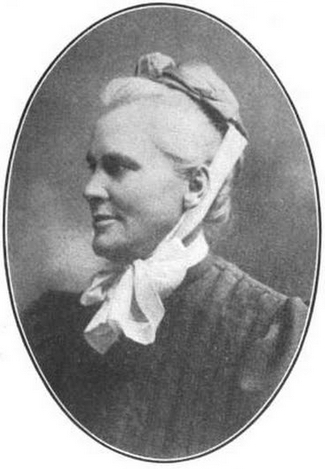
Martha Sheldon, from a 1913 publication.

Martha A. Sheldon (May 22, 1860 – October 10, 1912) was an American medical missionary in India, Nepal, and Tibet.

== Early life ==
Martha Alma Sheldon was born in Excelsior, Minnesota, the daughter of Charles B. Sheldon and Mary Keziah Prentice Sheldon. Her father was a Congregational minister. She graduated first in her class from the University of Minnesota in 1883, where she was also active in skating, rowing, and swimming. She earned a medical degree in Boston, Massachusetts.

== Career ==
Sheldon became a "missionary-deaconess" of the Methodist Episcopal Church in 1889, to serve in Darjeeling. After six years, she and Annie Budden moved to a mission post in the Pithoragarh district, near the India-Nepal border (in present-day Nepal). There she served from 1895 to 1912, most of those years with Eva C. M. Browne. The couple ran a small farm with vegetables, fruits, and cows. She learned the spoken Bhotiya language, devised a written version to record it, and composed translations of Christian texts for local use. She and Browne began a kindergarten, organized schools for girls and women, opened a clinic, built a church, and hosted visiting missionaries.

Sheldon and Browne traveled to Tibet in 1900–1902. In Tibet they offered medical care, helped start a Christian church, learned Tibetan and translated some texts into written Tibetan. "Again medical work opened the way for me to spend two weeks in Tibet. I was called to Lake Manasarowar to operate for cataract upon women living near the monastery," she wrote in a published letter. "It was a great joy to be in golden Tibet again." In one incident, the women disguised themselves as Bhotiya women to visit Taklakot, and held religious meetings, before officials asked them to leave.

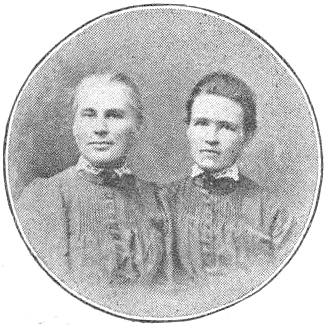
Martha Sheldon and Eva Browne, from a missionary pamphlet about Sheldon's work.

On furlough in the United States in 1905, Sheldon addressed the Woman's Foreign Missionary Society meetings, from Redlands, California to Marlboro, Massachusetts.

== Personal life ==
Sheldon died at Darchula in 1912, aged 72 years. Her partner Eva C. M. Browne wrote a biography of Sheldon. A biographical pamphlet was published by the Woman's Foreign Missionary Society of the Methodist Episcopal Church.
