= Porter Peak =

Mountain in Nevada, United States

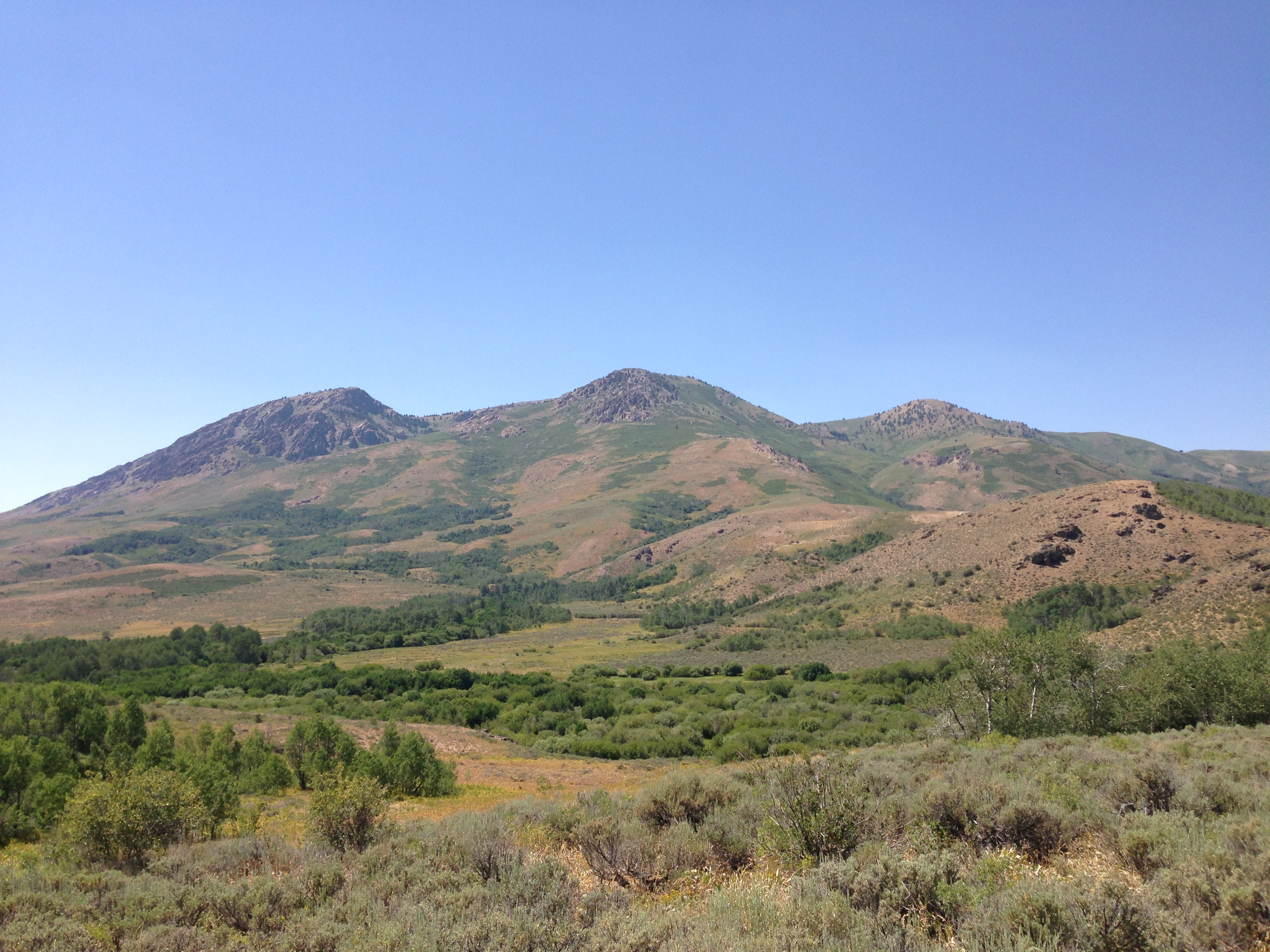
- View of Porter Peak from Maggie Summit Road

Highest point
- Elevation: 9,272 ft (2,826 m) NAVD 88
- Prominence: 2,662 ft (811 m)
- Coordinates: 41°40′52″N 116°08′13″W

Geography
- Location within Nevada
- Location: Elko County, Nevada, U.S.
- Parent range: Bull Run Mountains
- Topo map: USGS Bull Run Reservoir

Porter Peak is the highest mountain in the Bull Run Mountains of northern Elko County, Nevada. It is located in the Mountain City Ranger District of the Humboldt-Toiyabe National Forest.
