= USS Excel =

USS Excel is a name used more than once by the U.S. Navy:

- USS Excel (AM-94), was a minesweeper launched on 10 May 1942 and decommissioned 22 January 1946
- USS Excel (AM-439), was a minesweeper launched on 25 September 1953 and decommissioned 30 September 1992
