= Peter Excell =

British engineer, scientist, and researcher (1948–2020)

- Born: June 1948; England, United Kingdom
- Died: 13 August 2020 (aged 72)
- Education: University of Reading; (BSc. in Engineering Science - Electrical Option): University of Bradford; (PhD. in Electrical and Electronic Engineering)
- Known for: Computational electromagnetics Electromagnetic compatibility Radio-frequency engineering Wireless communication
- Scientific career
- Workplaces: University of Reading; Obafemi Awolowo University; University of Bradford; Wrexham Glyndŵr University

Peter Stuart Excell (June 1948 – 13 August 2020) was a British engineer, scientist, researcher and former Deputy Vice-chancellor at Wrexham Glyndŵr University.

== Early life, education, and career ==
Excell was born in June 1948. He earned a Bachelor of Science in Engineering Science (electrical option) in 1970 from the University of Reading. From 1970 to 1971, he was a research student in electronics at the Department of Physics, University of Ife, now Obafemi Awolowo University, Ile-Ifẹ, Nigeria, on a Government of the United Kingdom funded scheme called 'Study and Serve'. He later returned to the United Kingdom and he earned a Doctor of Philosophy in Electrical and Electronic Engineering at the University of Bradford in 1980. He worked at University of Bradford from 1971 to 2007, where he was, progressively, an Experimental Officer, Research Fellow, Lecturer, Senior Lecturer, Reader (academic rank) and ultimately a full Professor of applied electromagnetics.

In 2007, he joined the North-East Wales Institute of Higher Education in Wrexham (which rapidly became Wrexham Glyndŵr University). Here he held various roles including the Head of the School of Computing and Communications Technology, Dean of the Faculty of Arts, Science, and Technology, and Deputy Vice-chancellor until 2015, when he retired. Prior to his roles at Wrexham Glyndŵr University, he was Associate Dean for Research in the School of Informatics at University of Bradford.

In 2019, he became the first recipient of the higher doctorate degree of Doctor of Science from the collaboration between Wrexham Glyndŵr University and University of Chester. He also became a Fellow of the Learned Society of Wales in 2020.

== Death ==
Excell died on 13 August 2020. He is survived by his wife, Dianne, and children, Matthew and Charlotte.

== Legacy and research ==
He jointly filed for several patents on broadband antenna, directional antenna, movement detection system and multi-band antenna designs at various times during his long academic career. He published over 160 peer-reviewed articles in leading international journals on diverse topics in science and engineering. He was a Fellow of the Institution of Engineering and Technology and of the British Computer Society, and the Higher Education Academy, a Life Senior Member of the Institute of Electrical and Electronics Engineers, a Chartered Engineer (UK) and a Chartered IT Professional.

Excell's publications included several scholarly journal articles, magazine articles and conference proceedings available on the IEEE Xplore digital library.

== See also ==
- Peter Excell publications indexed by Google Scholar
