= XL =

XL or variants may stand for:

== Arts and entertainment ==
- XL Recordings, a British independent record label
- XL, a character in the animated series Buzz Lightyear of Star Command

== Businesses and organizations ==
=== Transportation ===
- XL Airways France, a French airline
- XL Airways Germany, a German charter airline
- XL Leisure Group, a major United Kingdom tour operator, which ceased operations in 2008
  - XL Airways UK, a defunct British airline which was part of XL Leisure Group
- LAN Ecuador (IATA airline code XL)

=== Other businesses and organizations ===
- XL Axiata, an Indonesian mobile phone network operator
- XL Center, a civic center in Hartford, Connecticut, United States now known as PeoplesBank Arena
- XL Cola, a Swedish soft drink
- XL Group, a financial services company headquartered in Ireland with executive offices in Bermuda
- Excel Esports, a British esports organization (shortened name is "XL")
- North Texas Intermediate Sanctions Facility, a privately operated prison facility (TDCJ shorthand is "XL")

== Science and technology ==
- XL (programming language), a programming language designed to support concept programming
- Weather Star XL (also known as just XL), a computer used by The Weather Channel for local forecasts
- X_{L}, inductive reactance, a property of an inductor

== Other uses ==
- Excess-of-loss reinsurance, a particular non-proportional type of reinsurance contact
- 40 (number) in Roman numerals
- XL, or Extra large, a clothing size

== See also ==
- Excel (disambiguation)
