= Mark Scott (radio host) =

American radio host (1936–2005)

- Born: 1936; United States
- Died: April 26, 2005 (aged 68–69); United States
- Occupation: Talk show host

Mark Scott (1936 – April 26, 2005) was an American talk radio host.

== Biography ==
Scott attended five colleges and served in the United States Marine Corps during the Korean War before starting his career in broadcasting.

He became a radio host on AM-1270 WXYZ (later WXYT after the station changed hands), starting in 1980 through the late 1990s. Politically, he referred to himself as a "Jeffersonian liberal" and strongly libertarian, and popularized many libertarian philosophical positions, especially those of novelist-philosopher Ayn Rand, in the metropolitan Detroit area. His trademark sign-off was a single word: "Excelsior!" He also promoted his show with the phrase "deus ex machina" which he translated as "the God of the Machine" (in this case the machine being the radio). He also commonly mentioned John Locke as well as Thomas Jefferson.

After WXYT changed format to an all Sports Talk station, Scott pioneered the use of the internet as a broadcast media by continuing his show on-line. His internet effort continued for 3 years, 3 hours a day, 5 days a week with the same guests as he had on Radio reaching out via the internet worldwide.

Scott died of congestive heart failure at Providence Hospital in Southfield, Michigan.
