= Brampton Excelsiors =

Brampton Excelsiors may refer to:

- Brampton Excelsiors (MSL), a box lacrosse team from Brampton, Ontario, Canada, who compete in the Major Series Lacrosse Senior "A" Lacrosse League
- Brampton Excelsiors Jr. A, a box lacrosse team from Brampton, Ontario, Canada, who compete in the OLA Junior A Lacrosse League
- Brampton Excelsiors, now Mississauga Tomahawks Jr. B, a box lacrosse team from Mississauga, Ontario, Canada. who compete in the OLA Junior B Lacrosse League
