= USS Unicoi =

Design 1027 cargo ship of the United States Navy

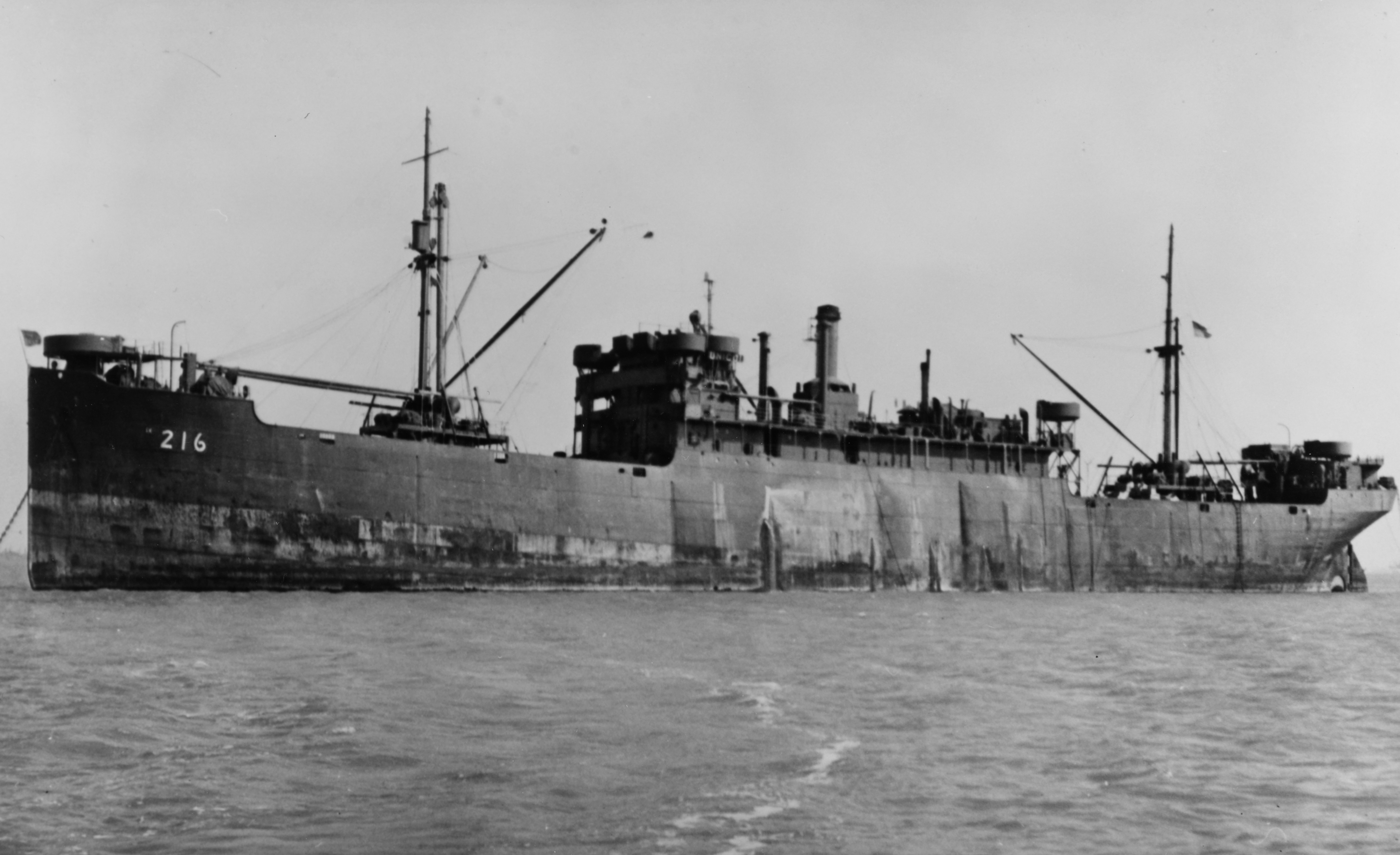
- USS Unicoi

History

United States
- Name: Unicoi (1920-1930s); Excelsior (1930s-1945); Unicoi (1945-1946)
- Namesake: Unicoi; Excelsior
- Owner: USSB (1920-1941); American Export Lines (1941-1945); United States Navy (1945-1946); War Shipping Administration (1946)
- Builder: Oscar Daniels Co.
- Launched: 23 October 1919
- Completed: May 1920
- Commissioned: 29 August 1942
- Out of service: 16 April 1946
- Stricken: 1 May 1946
- Identification: Hull number: IX-216
- Honors and awards: See Awards
- Fate: Scrapped, 7 October 1947

General characteristics
- Class & type: Design 1027 cargo ship
- Displacement: 13,150 t (12,942 long tons)
- Length: 416 ft 0 in (126.80 m)
- Beam: 54 ft 6 in (16.61 m)
- Draft: 27 ft 1 in (8.26 m)
- Installed power: 1 × shaft; 2,900 shp (2,200 kW)
- Propulsion: 1 × Worthington diesel engine
- Complement: 70 officers and enlisted
- Armament: 1 × single 4"/50 cal gun; 1 × single 3"/50 cal guns; 8 × single Oerlikon 20 mm cannons

SS Unicoi was an American Design 1027 cargo ship built in 1920 for service in World War II. She was later acquired by the United States Navy and renamed USS Unicoi (IX-216). Her namesake is a county and a mountain range in Tennessee. The word unicoi is derived from the Cherokee term "unaka" which means white.

== Description ==
The ship was 416 ft 0 in (126.80 m) long, with a beam of 54 ft 6 in (16.61 m) and a draft of 27 ft 1 in (8.26 m). She was assessed at 9,500 DWT.

She was powered by a single diesel engine, which was built by the Worthington Pump & Machinery Corporation, Harrison, New Jersey. It drove a single screw propeller.

== Construction and career ==
Unicoi (IX-216) was built in 1920 at Tampa, Florida, by Oscar Daniels Co. She was owned first by the United States Shipping Board (USSB) and later by the United States Maritime Commission. In the late 1930s or early 1940s, she was renamed Excelsior; but, by 1942, she was again renamed back to Unicoi.

Late in the afternoon of 15 July 1942, as Unicoi steamed southward off Cape Lookout, North Carolina, with convoy King Sail 520 (KS 520), a German submarine struck without warning and torpedoed three merchant vessels of the formation. Moments later, the submarine surfaced in the middle of the convoy only 350 yards from Unicoi. The ship's alert armed guard quickly took advantage of this unusual opportunity and fired a shell, scoring a hit on the submarine. Meanwhile, the two planes which supplied the convoy's air cover approached the submarine and dropped their depth charges. One depth charge actually hit the submarine and slid off before detonating. In all, four depth charges at close range finished off German submarine U-576 which left behind black oil, debris, and bubbles as she went to the bottom.

Unicoi continued on with the convoy to Key West where, on the 28th, she joined Convoy WAT-10 bound for Caribbean ports. The ship parted company with the convoy on 1 August off Guantanamo Bay and set her course via the Panama Canal to New Zealand. On 6 August, she departed with Convoy GP 4 from Guantanamo for Cristobal, in which she arrived 4 days later.

The ship alongside Convoy NA 41 left Langemak Bay on 13 August 1944, for Seeadler Harbor.

Around this time, she came under the control of the War Shipping Administration and was operated by American Export Lines, Inc. She continued operations in the Pacific until 20 April 1945 when she was transferred to the United States Navy outside Tacloban in Leyte Gulf. Accepted from the War Shipping Administration on bareboat charter, Unicoi was commissioned on 23 April 1945.

Designated an unclassified miscellaneous auxiliary ship (IX), she reported for duty with Service Squadron 8, Service Forces, Pacific; but, due to her age and disrepair, underwent extensive overhaul at Seeadler Harbor before taking up her duties as a mobile dry storage ship early in August, shortly before Japan capitulated. On the 7th, as she entered the channel at Green Island with a cargo of provisions for the island's Construction Battalion Maintenance Unit, she went aground. After unloading her cargo, shifting ballast and discharging 65 tons of fresh water over the side, she was refloated with the assistance of two landing craft late in the afternoon. Undamaged, she proceeded via Bougainville to the Treasury Islands where she loaded nets, buoys, and other equipment for transportation to the Philippines.

She arrived at Samar on 4 September and remained in the Philippines until 6 December when she set her course via Pearl Harbor for the west coast. Unicoi arrived at San Francisco on 2 February 1946, was decommissioned on 16 April, and returned on the same day to the War Shipping Administration at Suisun Bay, California. Her name was struck from the Navy Register on 1 May 1946, and she was later sold to the Walter W. Johnson Co. for scrapping.

== Awards ==
- American Campaign Medal
- Asiatic-Pacific Campaign Medal
- World War II Victory Medal
- Philippine Liberation Medal
