= Excel (automobile) =

Defunct American motor vehicle manufacturer

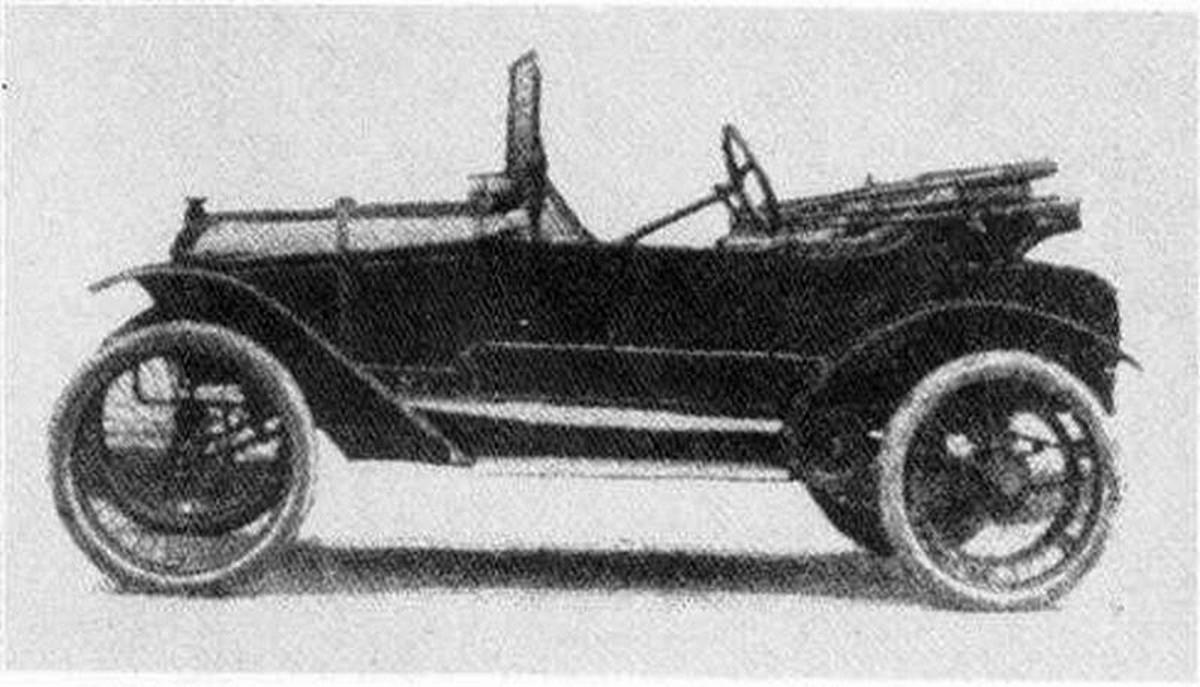
1914 Excel

The Excel was an American cyclecar manufactured in Detroit, Michigan by the Excel Distributing Company in 1914. The two-seater cyclecar weighed 1,000 lb (450 kg), and had a 1.5 L water-cooled four-cylinder engine. It was driven by a friction transmission with belts.
