= Sidney Excell =

British Army major (1906–1990)

- Born: 23 December 1906; Chatham, Kent, England
- Died: December 1990 (aged 83–84)
- Military career
- Allegiance: United Kingdom
- Branch: British Army
- Rank: Major

Sidney Excell (23 December 1906 – December 1990) was a British Army major during World War II. He is remembered for the 1945 arrest of Nazi Reichsführer-SS Heinrich Himmler in Bremervörde, Germany.

== Early life ==
Educated at marine school in Chatham, Excell worked as an apprenticed shoe maker before joining the metropolitan police and then volunteering for the Palestine Police, in which he served in the 1930s. There he met his wife, Lisa, a Jewish Russian-Polish immigrant who had emigrated with her family to escape pogroms. They then left Palestine and went to England (British police were not allowed to fraternise with Jews or Arabs in Palestine). They were then married in Epping Essex.

== Arrest of Himmler ==
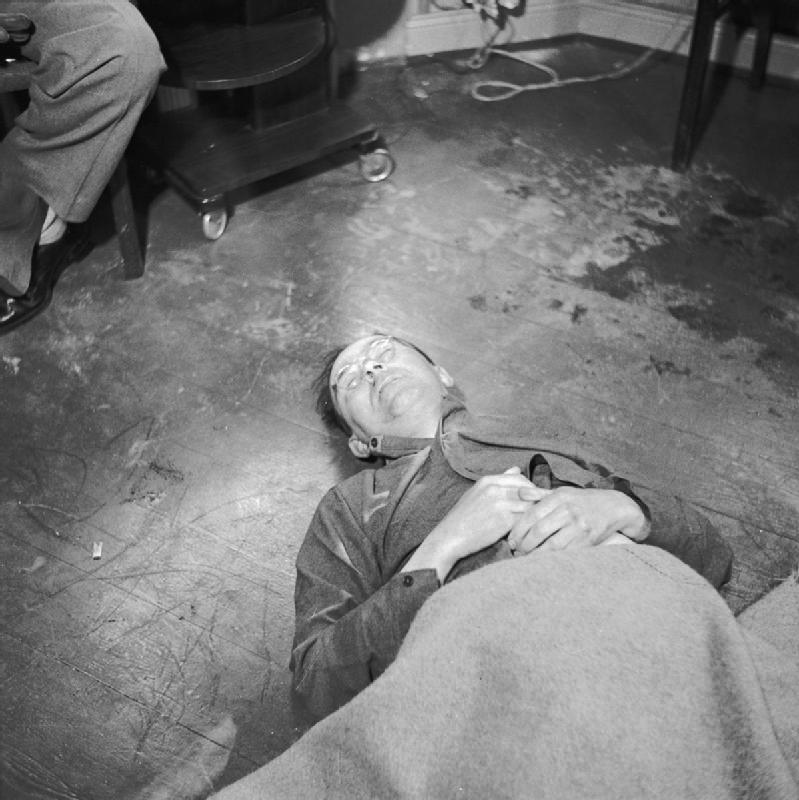
Himmler's corpse in Allied custody after his suicide by poison, 1945

On 22 May 1945, the British Army were manning a checkpoint at the Bremervorde Bridge in West Germany when three men were brought in for questioning and their documents examined. One, claiming to be "Heinrich Hitzinger", raised suspicion, and Excell arrested all three. British soldier Arthur Britton soon identified "Hitzinger" as Heinrich Himmler. The next day, while in custody in Lüneburg, Himmler committed suicide by poison, biting into a capsule of potassium cyanide before he could be interrogated.

== Life after World War II ==
Excell continued to serve in the British Army. He was medically discharged from the army after contracting rheumatoid arthritis in his hands. He then went on to serve in the British Mandate Police in Palestine. Later, he worked for the London Electricity Board as an electrical engineer until he retired.

He died from heart failure in 1990 and is survived by two sons, four grandsons and three granddaughters, all of whom still carry his surname.
