= Excelsior, Georgia =

Unincorporated community in Georgia, U.S.

Coordinates: 32°18′49″N 81°57′57″W

Excelsior is an unincorporated community in Candler County, in the U.S. state of Georgia.

== History ==
The community was named after nearby Excelsior Schoolhouse. A post office called Excelsior was established in 1879, and remained in operation until 1905. Variant names were "Little Creek" and "Red Branch".
