= Jill Insley =

British journalist

- Occupation: Journalist
- Employers: The Guardian; The Sunday Times
- Known for: Question of Money; Orlando (cat)
- Website: insleymedia.com

Jill Insley is a British financial journalist who has written for The Guardian and The Sunday Times, including the Question of Money consumer advice column.

== Orlando the cat ==
Outcome of stock-picking challenge (in Scots)

In a 2012 portfolio stock valuation challenge by The Observer, Jill Insley's pet cat, Orlando, outperformed a team of professional investors. In reaction, Insley wrote "My cat is a genius."
