= SS Excelsior (ship) =

SS Excelsior may refer to one of these ships:

- SS Excelsior (1883), an Australian ferry, in service 1883–1919
- SS Excelsior (1894), renamed SS Petrolite, an oil tanker in service with the Standard Oil Company of New Jersey from 1894 to 1917
- SS Excelsior (1919), a Design 1027 ship built as SS Unicoi by the Oscar Daniels Company; named Excelsior from 1940 to 1942; scrapped in 1947
- SS Excelsior (1942) (MC hull number 589, Type C3-S-A3), built by Bethlehem Sparrows Point Shipyard; acquired by the United States Navy and converted to Windsor-class attack transport USS Windsor (APA-55); sold for commercial service in 1947; scrapped in 1972
- SS Excelsior (1943) (MC hull number 5891, Type C3-S-A3), built by Bethlehem Sparrows Point Shipyard; acquired by the United States Army for use as troop ship USAT Excelsior; carried troops from England to Normandy for D-Day; sold for commercial service in 1946; scrapped in 1970
