= Excelsior Public School (Excelsior, Minnesota) =

- U.S. National Register of Historic Places
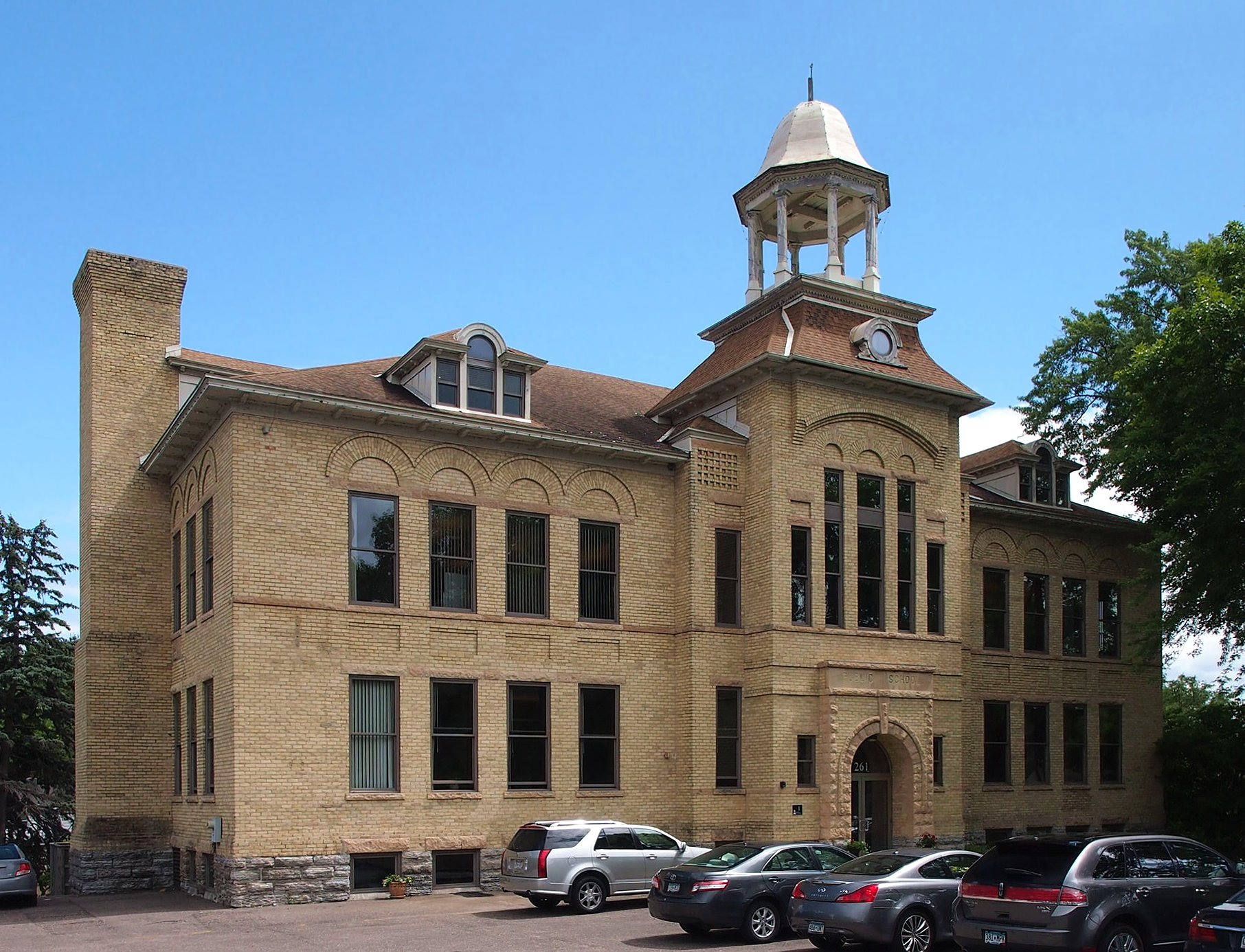
- Excelsior Public School from the northwest

- Location within Minnesota Location within the United States
- Location: 261 School Avenue, Excelsior, Minnesota
- Coordinates: 44°54′5″N 93°33′53″W
- Built: 1899
- Architect: L.F. Sampson
- Architectural style: Late 19th And 20th Century Revivals, Post-Victorian Eclectic
- NRHP reference No.: 80002068
- Added to NRHP: November 13, 1980

Excelsior Public School is a former school building in Excelsior, Minnesota, United States, listed on the National Register of Historic Places. The school was built in the Georgian Revival style between 1899 and 1901 to serve Excelsior during a time of growth in the community. Before this building was built, two other school buildings were located on the site. The first was moved to 321-323 Third Street, and the second was destroyed by fire.

The building originally housed grades 1 through 7 in four classrooms on the first floor, and eighth-grade and high school students were on the second floor. At the time of its construction, it was deemed the finest school in rural Hennepin County. By 1908, the school served 308 students, and by 1915 the high school students had moved to a new building on Oak Street.

The school bell, mounted in a bell tower, had to be removed from the tower in 1962 because of a decaying structure. It was mounted on a granite pedestal next to the Excelsior Public Library in 1966. In 1964, the school was closed, and later became administrative offices for the Minnetonka School District. The building is currently used for office space.
