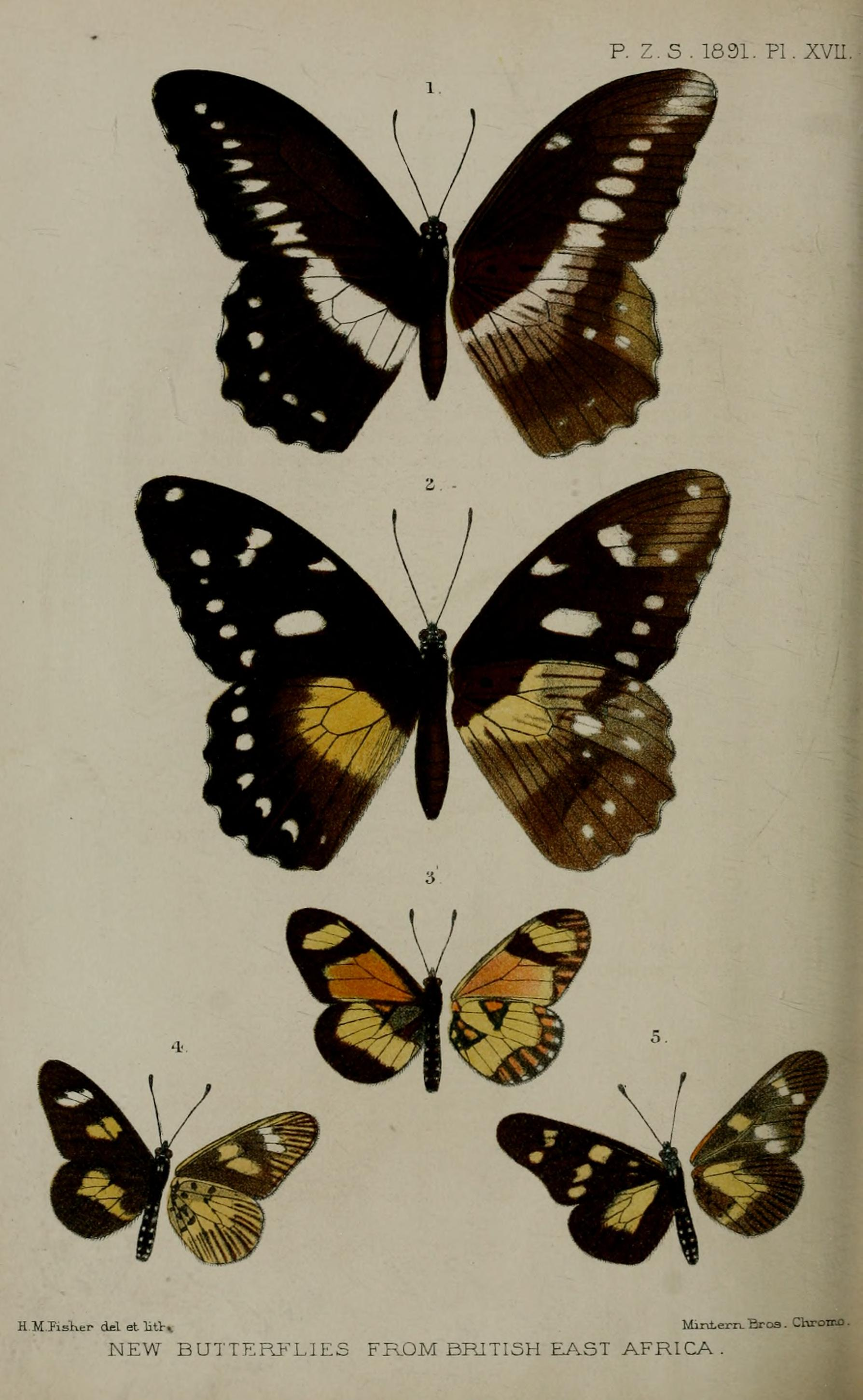
- Figure 3

Scientific classification
- Kingdom: Animalia
- Phylum: Arthropoda
- Class: Insecta
- Order: Lepidoptera
- Family: Nymphalidae
- Genus: Acraea
- Species: A. excelsior

Binomial name
- Acraea excelsior Sharpe, 1891

Synonyms
- Acraea (Actinote) excelsior

= Acraea excelsior =

Species of butterfly

Acraea excelsior is a butterfly in the family Nymphalidae. It is found in Kenya and Tanzania.

== Description ==
A. excelsior E. Sharpe (56 a) nearly approaches the preceding species [ Acraea goetzei and is quite similarly marked above, but has the median band of the hindwing and the subapical band of the forewing light lemon-yellow and the hindmarginal spot of the fore wing also margined with light yellowish. The under surface of the hindwing only differs in having the marginal band deeper black without light lines on the veins, while the black basal and discal dots of cellules 1 a to 1 c form a red-spotted patch and those of cellules 5 to 7 a sharp, red-centred triangle. Nyassaland; German and British East Africa.

== Subspecies ==
- Acraea excelsior excelsior (central Kenya, southern Tanzania)
- Acraea excelsior usambarae Jackson, 1951 (Tanzania: north-east to the Usambara Mountains)

== Biology ==
The larvae feed on Triumfetta macrophylla.

== Taxonomy ==
Acraea excelsior is a member of the Acraea bonasia species group; see Acraea.

See also Pierre & Bernaud, 2014
