= Excelsior, Minnesota =

Lakeside city in Minnesota, United States

- City
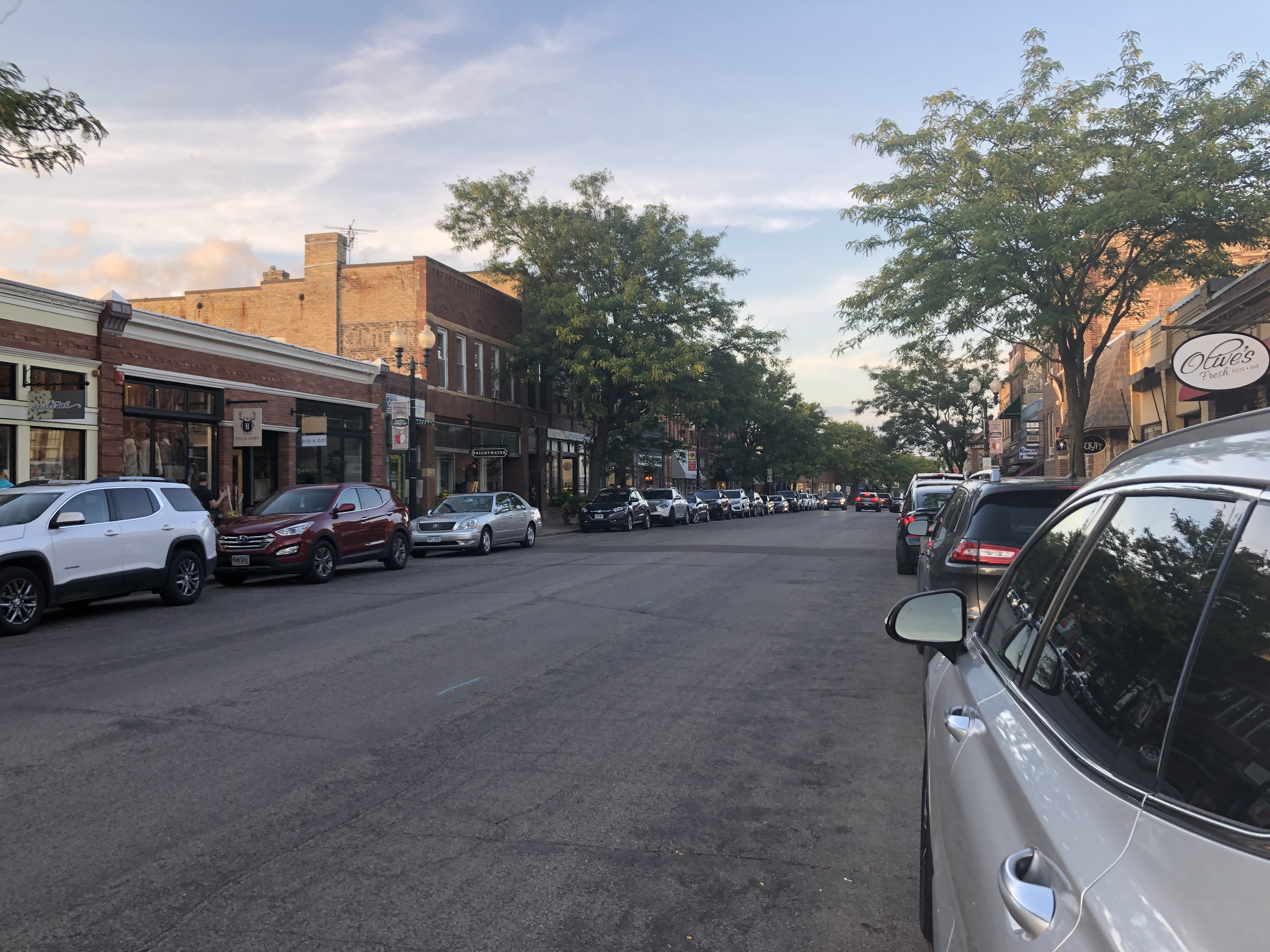
- Water Street in Excelsior

- Logo

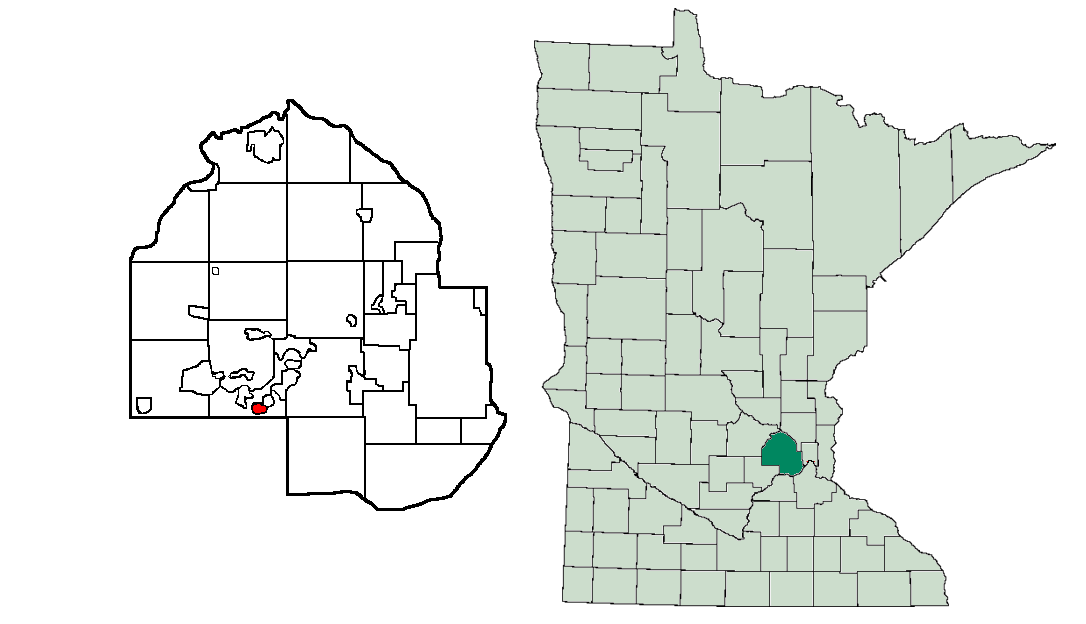
- Location of Excelsior within Hennepin County and the U.S. state of Minnesota

- Location within Minnesota Location within the United States
- Coordinates: 44°54′12″N 93°33′59″W
- Country: United States
- State: Minnesota
- County: Hennepin
- Founded: 1853
- Incorporated: 1878

Government
  - Mayor: Todd Carlson

Area
  - Total: 0.88 sq mi (2.27 km^{2})
  - Land: 0.63 sq mi (1.63 km^{2})
  - Water: 0.25 sq mi (0.64 km^{2})
- Elevation: 945 ft (288 m)

Population (2020)
  - Total: 2,355
  - Density: 3,740.5/sq mi (1,444.23/km^{2})
- Time zone: UTC-6 (Central (CST))
  - Summer (DST): UTC-5 (CDT)
- ZIP Code: 55331
- Area code: 952
- FIPS code: 27-20078
- GNIS feature ID: 643477
- Website: www.ci.excelsior.mn.us

Excelsior (/ɛkˈsɛlsiər/ ek-SEL-see-ər) is a city in Hennepin County, Minnesota, United States. A western suburb of the Twin Cities, Excelsior is about 16 miles (26 km) southwest of downtown Minneapolis. Its population was 2,355 at the 2020 census.

Excelsior's commercial district along Water Street is listed on the National Register of Historic Places, and the town has many historic Victorian-era houses. Located on Lake Minnetonka's southern shore, the city serves as a local destination for shoppers, boaters, and restaurant-goers.

== History ==
The first Euro-Americans known to have visited Lake Minnetonka were two teenage boys, Joe Brown and Will Snelling, who canoed up Minnehaha Creek from Fort Saint Anthony in 1822.

Minnesota's territorial governor Alexander Ramsey officially named Lake Minnetonka in 1852. He had been informed that the Dakota called the lake Mní iá Tháŋka ("the-water-they-speak-of-is-large"). The next year, a group of settlers from upstate New York established Excelsior, the lake's first white settlement. The former Excelsior Township was named after the hamlet.

During the late 19th century, the Excelsior and Lake Minnetonka area was home to several popular summer lake resorts.

Streetcars were used in Excelsior as a part of the Twin City Rapid Transit Company system until 1932, when the line was cut back to Hopkins.

=== 20th century ===
A large ballroom called "Danceland" (later "Big Reggie's Danceland") stood across the street from Excelsior Amusement Park from the mid-1920s to 1973. Operated by Ray Colihan, it hosted performances by Lawrence Welk, Fred Waring, and the Andrews Sisters in the 1930s. On May 3, 1963, the Beach Boys performed at Danceland. Beach Boys singer Mike Love remembered the performance as a significant moment for the band in a 2019 interview. According to Love, people "were breaking the windows to get into [Danceland] because it was sold out... I said to one of my bandmates: 'This must be like when Elvis was starting out.'" On June 12, 1964, The Rolling Stones played Danceland for an audience of 283. It has been speculated that Excelsior resident Jimmy Hutmaker inspired Mick Jagger to write the 1969 song "You Can't Always Get What You Want" after a chance encounter at a local drugstore earlier that day, but this claim has long been disputed.

In 1974 President Gerald Ford purchased a Golden Retriever named Liberty from Excelsior resident Avis Friberg.

=== 21st century ===
Over the years, Excelsior's downtown historic district has been home to many businesses, including hotels, restaurants, and merchants. Since 2010, restaurants and eateries have come to dominate the town's commercial landscape. Excelsior is known for maintaining its historical identity. Beyond the downtown district, it also retains much of its Victorian-era housing stock. Strict building codes are enforced in order to preserve this identity.

The Excelsior Commons and Lake Minnetonka are central amenities to the community and major draws for tourists. The Minnesota Streetcar Museum, a local transportation museum, maintains a heritage streetcar line in Excelsior and operates three restored streetcars on the line: Twin City Lines No. 1239, Winona Power & Light Co. #10, and Duluth Street Railway No. 78.

== Geography ==
Excelsior is in Hennepin County, Minnesota, on Lake Minnetonka's south shore. It is approximately 15 miles (24 km) southwest of Minneapolis and bordered by Shorewood and Greenwood. According to the United States Census Bureau, Excelsior has an area of 0.69 square miles (1.79 km^{2}), of which 0.63 square miles (1.63 km^{2}) is land and 0.06 square miles (0.16 km^{2}) is water. Minnesota State Highway 7 serves as a main route through the city, leading east-northeast 11 miles (18 km) to Highway 100 in Saint Louis Park and west 41 miles (66 km) to Hutchinson.

== Demographics ==
Historical population
Census	Pop.	Note	%±
1880	417		—
1890	619		48.4%
1900	717		15.8%
1910	1,015		41.6%
1920	790		−22.2%
1930	1,072		35.7%
1940	1,422		32.6%
1950	1,763		24.0%
1960	2,020		14.6%
1970	2,563		26.9%
1980	2,523		−1.6%
1990	2,367		−6.2%
2000	2,393		1.1%
2010	2,188		−8.6%
2020	2,355		7.6%
U.S. Decennial Census

=== 2020 census ===
As of the 2020 census, Excelsior had a population of 2,355. The median age was 49.6 years. 14.9% of residents were under the age of 18 and 24.8% of residents were 65 years of age or older. For every 100 females there were 94.1 males, and for every 100 females age 18 and over there were 89.7 males age 18 and over.

100.0% of residents lived in urban areas, while 0.0% lived in rural areas.

There were 1,148 households in Excelsior, of which 19.7% had children under the age of 18 living in them. Of all households, 33.7% were married-couple households, 27.2% were households with a male householder and no spouse or partner present, and 32.5% were households with a female householder and no spouse or partner present. About 44.0% of all households were made up of individuals and 15.4% had someone living alone who was 65 years of age or older.

There were 1,276 housing units, of which 10.0% were vacant. The homeowner vacancy rate was 2.9% and the rental vacancy rate was 5.4%.

Racial composition as of the 2020 census
Race	Number	Percent
White	2,035	86.4%
Black or African American	50	2.1%
American Indian and Alaska Native	11	0.5%
Asian	51	2.2%
Native Hawaiian and Other Pacific Islander	0	0.0%
Some other race	91	3.9%
Two or more races	117	5.0%
Hispanic or Latino (of any race)	159	6.8%

=== 2010 census ===
Restored TCRT streetcar No. 1239, Excelsior Streetcar Line

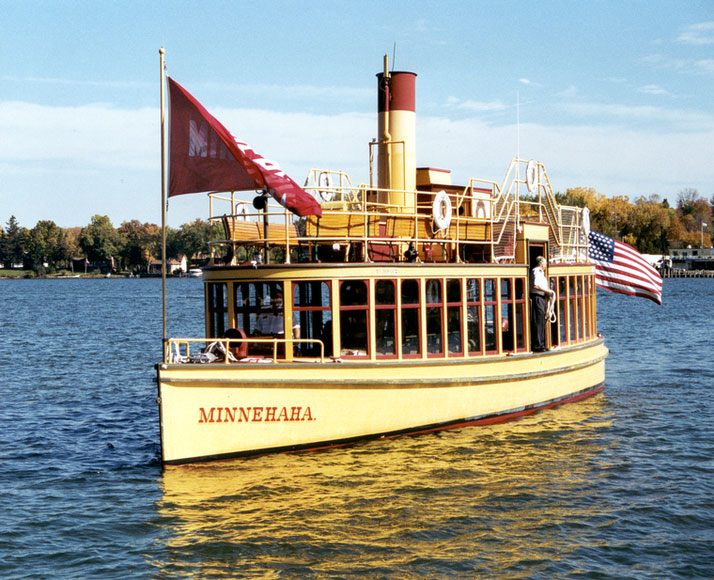
Restored Express Boat Minnehaha

As of the 2010 census, there were 2,188 people, 1,115 households, and 494 families living in the city. The population density was 3,473.0 inhabitants per square mile (1,340.9/km^{2}). There were 1,254 housing units at an average density of 1,990.5 per square mile (768.5/km^{2}). The racial makeup of the city was 90.4% White, 2.7% African American, 0.6% Native American, 1.5% Asian, 0.1% Pacific Islander, 2.2% from other races, and 2.5% from two or more races. Hispanic or Latino of any race were 5.9% of the population.

There were 1,115 households, of which 21.0% had children under the age of 18 living with them, 31.7% were married couples living together, 9.1% had a female householder with no husband present, 3.6% had a male householder with no wife present, and 55.7% were non-families. 48.3% of all households were made up of individuals, and 12.2% had someone living alone who was 65 years of age or older. The average household size was 1.92 and the average family size was 2.82.

The median age in the city was 42 years. 19.1% of residents were under the age of 18; 8.1% were between the ages of 18 and 24; 27.4% were from 25 to 44; 30.3% were from 45 to 64; and 15.4% were 65 years of age or older. The gender makeup of the city was 48.4% male and 51.6% female.

=== 2000 census ===
As of the 2000 census, there were 2,393 people, 1,199 households, and 547 families living in the city. The population density was 3,822.9 inhabitants per square mile (1,476.0/km^{2}). There were 1,254 housing units at an average density of 2,003.3 per square mile (773.5/km^{2}). The racial makeup of the city was 94.07% White, 0.75% African American, 0.33% Native American, 2.21% Asian, 1.55% from other races, and 1.09% from two or more races. Hispanic or Latino of any race were 3.13% of the population.

There were 1,199 households, out of which 22.1% had children under the age of 18 living with them, 32.2% were married couples living together, 9.9% had a female householder with no husband present, and 54.3% were non-families. 45.2% of all households were made up of individuals, and 14.1% had someone living alone who was 65 years of age or older. The average household size was 1.95 and the average family size was 2.80.

The median age in the city was 37 years. 19.5% under the age of 18, 10.0% from 18 to 24, 33.3% from 25 to 44, 21.8% from 45 to 64, and 15.3% who were 65 years of age or older. For every 100 females, there were 88.1 males. For every 100 females age 18 and over, there were 85.7 males.

The median income for a household in the city was $43,598, and the median income for a family was $61,406. Males had a median income of $40,845 versus $28,717 for females. The per capita income for the city was $29,127. About 3.6% of families and 5.7% of the population were below the poverty line, including 4.0% of those under age 18 and 5.6% of those age 65 or over.

== Politics ==
Presidential election results

Precinct General Election Results
Year	Republican	Democratic	Third parties
2024	37.6% 534	60.4% 858	2.0% 20
2020	39.0% 615	58.7% 925	2.3% 37
2016	38.4% 522	52.7% 716	8.9% 120
2012	43.1% 564	54.5% 712	2.4% 32
2008	40.9% 553	56.4% 762	2.7% 37
2004	43.6% 580	55.1% 732	1.3% 17
2000	43.6% 562	47.7% 615	8.7% 113
1996	41.0% 485	48.0% 568	11.0% 131
1992	32.2% 462	40.5% 581	27.3% 392
1988	47.6% 600	52.4% 660	0.0% 0
1984	53.8% 739	46.2% 635	0.0% 0
1980	42.4% 566	44.5% 580	12.1% 157
1976	49.0% 684	48.6% 678	2.4% 33
1972	55.6% 713	43.2% 554	1.2% 15
1968	51.3% 541	46.0% 485	2.7% 28
1964	49.8% 492	50.2% 496	0.0% 0
1960	61.3% 562	38.4% 416	0.3% 3

== Parks and recreation ==
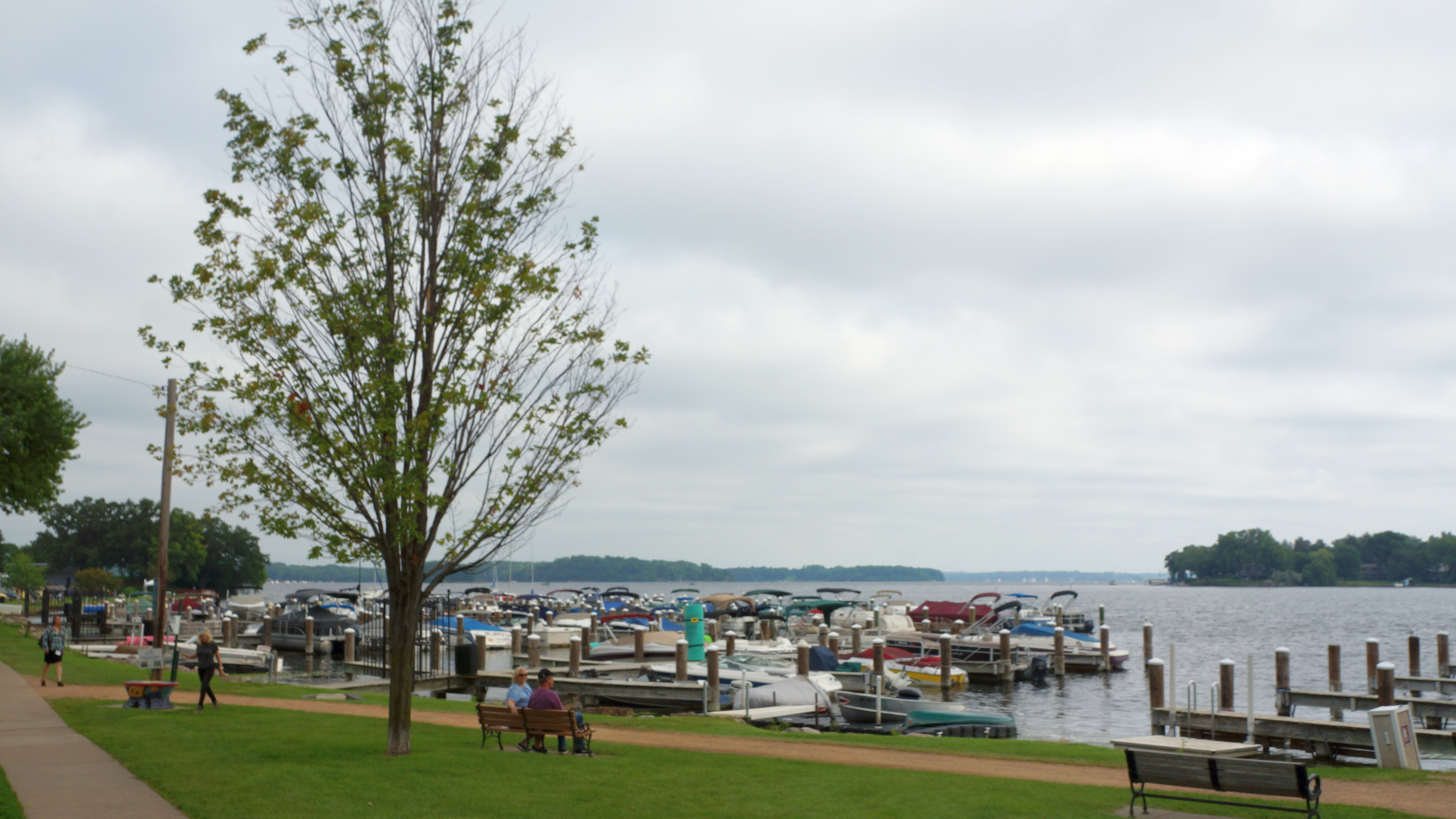
Excelsior Commons and marina

The Commons and Port of Excelsior is a 13-acre (5.3 ha) municipal park developed in 1854. Other notable recreation areas include Excelsior Parkland and the Lake Minnetonka shoreline.

Since 1935, the Apple Days festival has been held in Excelsior annually to celebrate apple-picking season.

== Education ==
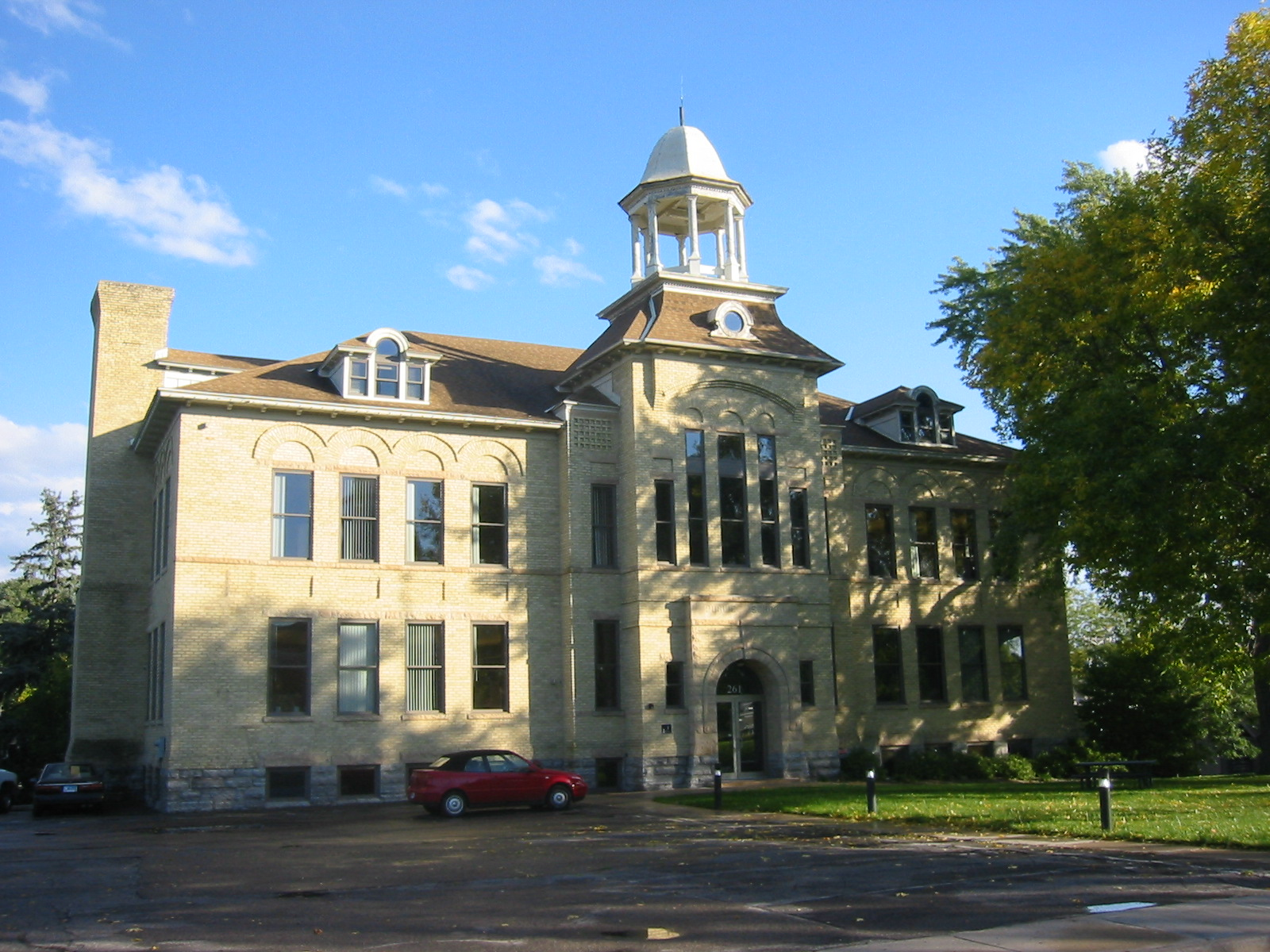
Former Excelsior Public School

Excelsior is in Independent School District 276, also known as the Minnetonka School District. Newsweek ranked Minnetonka High School 123rd on its list of America's Top High Schools. Niche rated the school the state's best public high school.

The only school Minnetonka Public Schools operates in Excelsior is Excelsior Elementary School. The old Excelsior Public School and Excelsior High School buildings still stand, but are no longer used as schools.

== Religion ==
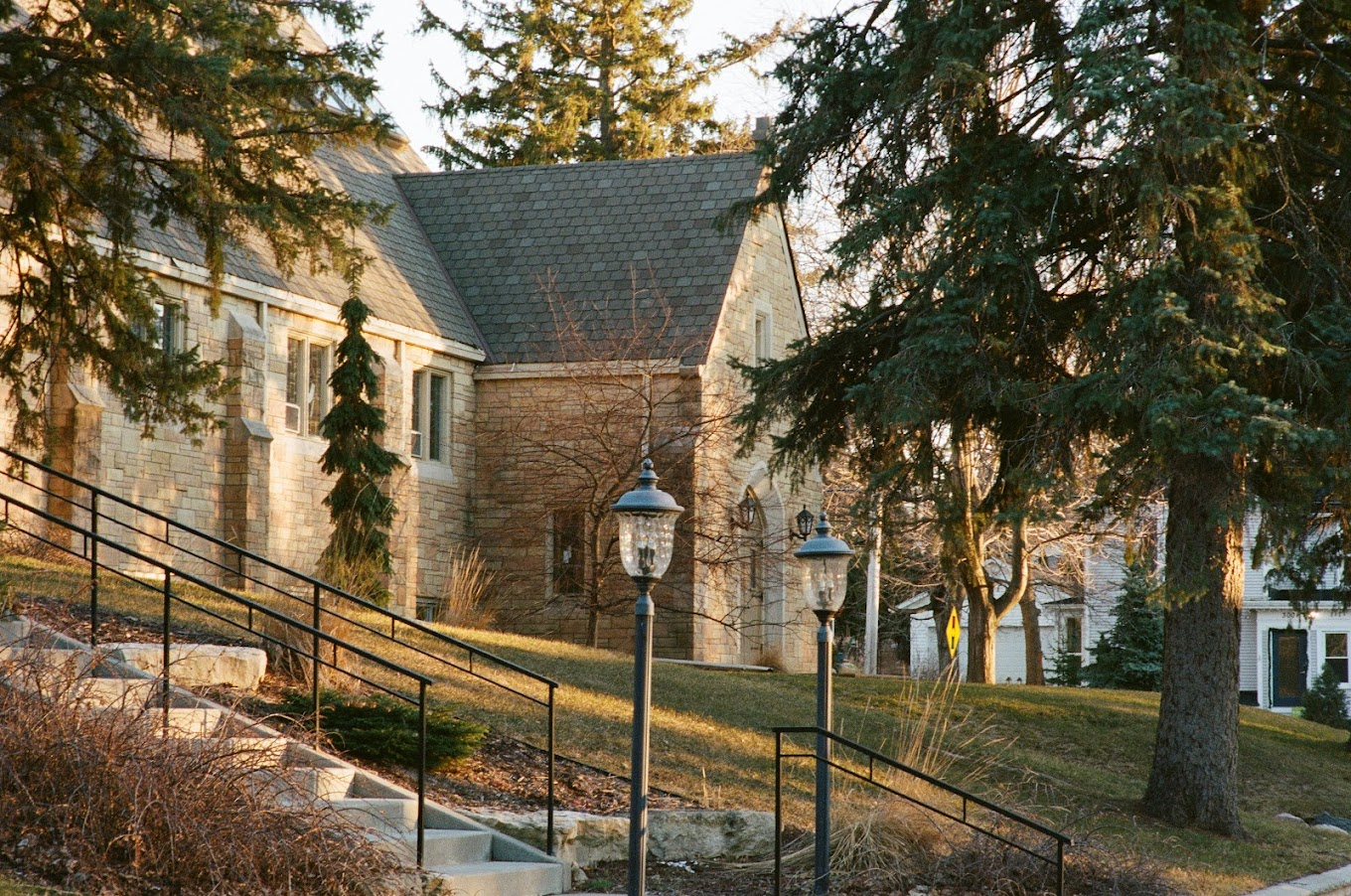
Mount Calvary Lutheran Church, one of the churches in Excelsior

Excelsior is home to many churches and places of worship, of which the majority are denominations of Christianity. Its largest churches by membership and attendance are Westwood Community Church and Mount Calvary Lutheran Church.

- Christ Community Church
- Congregational Church of Excelsior (UCC)
- Excelsior Covenant Church (ECC)
- Excelsior United Methodist Church
- Faith Church
- Mount Calvary Lutheran Church (ELCA)
- New Life Sanctuary (UPCI)
- Our Savior Lutheran Church (LCMS)
- St. John the Baptist Catholic Parish
- Trinity Episcopal Church
- Westview Seventh-Day Adventist Church
- Westwood Community Church

== Notable people ==
- Haley Kalil, Sports Illustrated Swimsuit Issue model and Miss Minnesota USA
- Terry Katzman, music producer and sound engineer
- Vinni Lettieri, professional hockey player
- Liberty, presidential dog
- Ryan McCartan, actor and singer
- Brent Sass, dog musher
- Martha Sheldon, medical missionary
- Grace Zumwinkle, professional hockey player in the PWHL and internationally representing the United States

== In popular culture ==
Excelsior is the setting of Monica Ferris's Needlecraft Mystery book series.
