= Excelsior (restaurant) =

Coordinates: 52°22′2.92″N 4°53′38.76″E

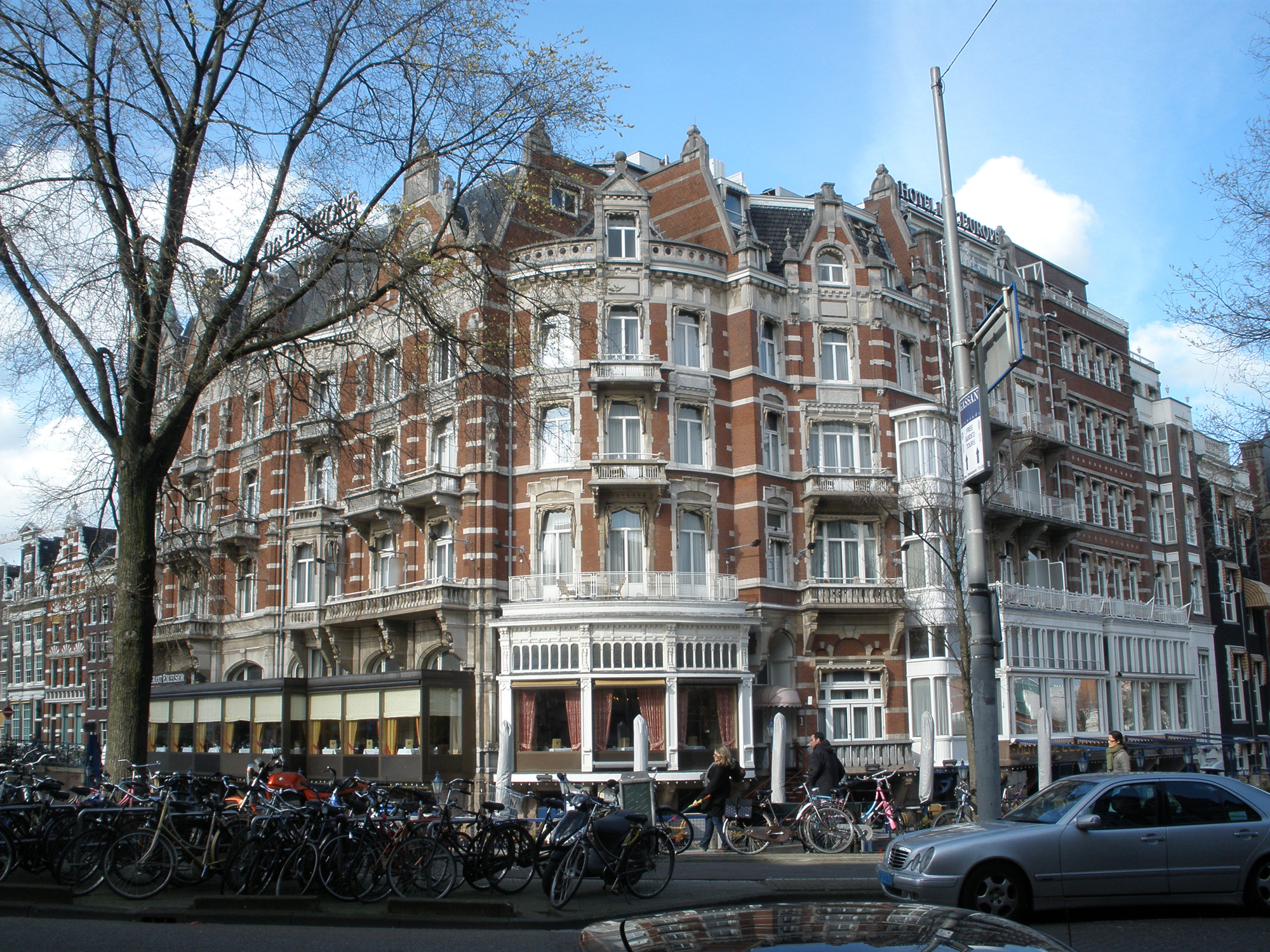
- Hotel de l'Europe with restaurant Excelsior on the left hand side.
- Interactive map of Excelsior

Restaurant information
- Head chef: Richard Van Oostenbrugge
- Food type: French
- Rating: Michelin Guide
- Location: Nieuwe Doelenstraat 2-14, Amsterdam, 1012 CP, Netherlands
- Seating capacity: 44
- Other information: Closed down in 2010

Excelsior is a defunct restaurant located in Hotel de l'Europe, Amsterdam, Netherlands. It was a fine dining restaurant that was awarded one Michelin stars for the period 1957-1970 and for the period 1987–1992.

Restaurant Excelsior closed in 2010 and was replaced by "Restaurant Bord'Eau" in February 2011.

== Head chefs ==
Amongst others:

- B. Koeleman 1938-1940
- Gerard Dresscher 1979-1989
- Imko Binnerts 1989-1994
- Jean Jacques Menanteau 1994-2009
- Richard van Oostenbrugge 2010

== See also ==
- List of Michelin starred restaurants in the Netherlands
