= Benton Township, Cedar County, Missouri =

Township in Cedar County, Missouri, U.S.

Coordinates: 37.6708°N 94.0061°W

Benton Township is an inactive township in Cedar County, in the U.S. state of Missouri.

Benton Township was established in the 1840s, taking the name of Thomas Hart Benton, a state legislator.
