= Excelsior, Webster County, West Virginia =

Unincorporated community in West Virginia, United States

Excelsior
- Unincorporated community
- Location within the state of West Virginia Excelsior (the United States)
- Coordinates: 38°27′18″N 80°28′21″W
- Country: United States
- State: West Virginia
- County: Webster
- Time zone: UTC-5 (Eastern (EST))
  - Summer (DST): UTC-4 (EDT)
- GNIS feature ID: 1551075

Excelsior is an unincorporated community in Webster County, West Virginia, United States. It is located along County Route 36/1.
