= Benton Township, Douglas County, Missouri =

Township in Missouri, U.S.

Coordinates: 36°56′09″N 92°41′21″W

Benton Township is a township in Douglas County, in the U.S. state of Missouri. The county seat, Ava, is located in the township.
