= Bull Run Mountains (Nevada) =

Mountain range in Nevada, United States

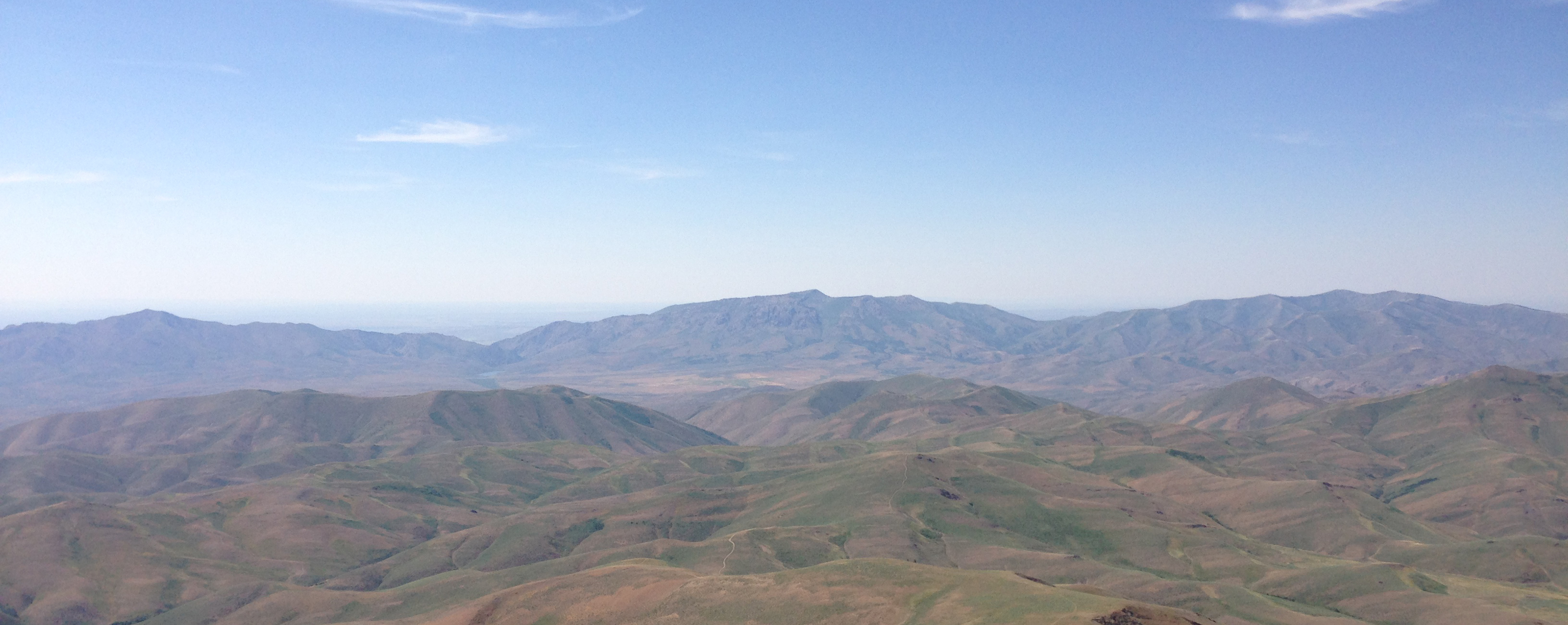
- Bull Run Mountains viewed from the Independence Mountains

Highest point
- Peak: Porter Peak
- Elevation: 2,791 m (9,157 ft)

Geography
- Location within Nevada
- Country: United States
- State: Nevada
- District: Elko County
- Range coordinates: 41°50′7.644″N 116°8′38.350″W
- Topo map: USGS Dry Creek Reservoir

The Bull Run Mountains is a mountain range in Elko County, Nevada, United States. Much of the range is contained within the Mountain City Ranger District of the Humboldt–Toiyabe National Forest. Porter Peak, at 9,157 feet (2,791 m) is the highest point of the range.

The range was named in commemoration of the Battle of Bull Run, in the American Civil War.
