= USS Excel (AM-94) =

Minesweeper of the United States Navy

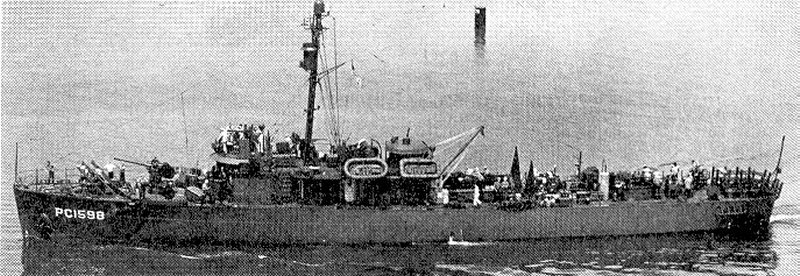

History

United States
- Name: USS Excel
- Builder: Jakobson Shipyard, Inc., Oyster Bay, Long Island, New York
- Laid down: 19 December 1941
- Launched: 10 May 1942
- Commissioned: 10 December 1942
- Renamed: USS PC-1598, 1 June 1944
- Decommissioned: 22 January 1946
- Fate: Sold, 11 June 1947

General characteristics
- Class & type: Adroit-class minesweeper
- Displacement: 275 long tons (279 t)
- Length: 173 ft 8 in (52.93 m)
- Beam: 23 ft (7.0 m)
- Draft: 7 ft 7 in (2.31 m)
- Propulsion: 2 × 1,770 bhp (1,320 kW) Cooper Bessemer GNB-8 diesel engines (Serial No. 1985 & 1986); Farrel-Birmingham single reduction gear; 2 shafts
- Speed: 18 knots (33 km/h)
- Complement: 85
- Armament: 1 × 3 in (76 mm)/50 cal; 1 × 40 mm gun; 5 × 20 mm cannons; 2 × rocket launchers; 4 × depth charge throwers; 2 × depth charge tracks

USS Excel (AM-94) was an Adroit-class minesweeper of the United States Navy. Laid down on 19 December 1941 by the Jakobson Shipyard, Inc., Oyster Bay, Long Island, New York, launched on 10 May 1942, and commissioned on 11 December 1942. The ship was reclassified as a submarine chaser, PC-1598 on 1 June 1944.

== World War II Atlantic operations ==
USS Excel arrived at Norfolk, Virginia, on 21 January 1943 for minesweeping exercises in the Virginia Capes, then sailed to Portland, Maine, where she based for patrol and minesweeping duty from 15 March 1943 to 3 February 1944. She was reclassified PC-1598 on 1 June. Returning to Norfolk, she had local patrol, sweeping, and training duty until 9 June, when she sailed for San Diego, California, and Pearl Harbor, arriving on 1 August.

== Service as a submarine chaser ==
After serving as escort on a voyage to Eniwetok, PC-1598 departed Pearl Harbor on 14 October 1944 to escort a convoy of LSTs by way of Eniwetok and Guam to Ulithi. Here a new convoy of landing craft was assembled, and with it PC-1598 arrived at Hollandia, New Guinea, on 16 November. For the next two months, she escorted convoys among the ports of New Guinea, aiding in the assembling of shipping for the Lingayen assault. She left Hollandia on 10 January 1945 on escort duty for San Pedro Bay, Leyte, and on 9 February, arrived at Ulithi, where she joined in exercises, and transported men from place to place in the vast fleet anchorage.

In company with six other minecraft, PC-1598 sailed from Ulithi on 19 March 1945 to sweep mines off Okinawa, clearing the way for both pre-invasion bombardment and the assault landings of 1 April. She carried out her hazardous mission successfully, destroying many enemy mines, and sailed from the island on 5 April for a repair period at Guam. PC-1598 gave patrol and escort services in the Marianas, and on 3 July she rescued a downed aviator. After voyaging to Okinawa in the escort for a large convoy between 8 and 21 July, she returned to duty in the Marianas. On 5 August, she made rendezvous off Saipan with the submarine Shad (SS-235) to take off one of the officers, who was severely ill.

PC-1598 operated out of Saipan until 17 October 1945, when she sailed for San Francisco, California.

== Decommissioning ==
PC-1598 was decommissioned on 22 January 1946 at San Francisco, California, and sold on 11 June 1947 to the Tidewater/Shaver Barge Lines of Suisun Bay, California. Fate unknown.
