= Benton Township, Knox County, Missouri =

Inactive township in the American state of Missouri

Coordinates: 40.2597°N 92.1183°W

Benton Township is an inactive township in Knox County, in the U.S. state of Missouri.

Benton Township has the name of Thomas Hart Benton, a state legislator.
