= Excelsior, Upshur County, West Virginia =

Unincorporated community in West Virginia, United States

Excelsior
- Unincorporated community
- Location within the state of West Virginia Excelsior (the United States)
- Coordinates: 38°57′20″N 80°8′21″W
- Country: United States
- State: West Virginia
- County: Upshur
- Time zone: UTC-5 (Eastern (EST))
  - Summer (DST): UTC-4 (EDT)

Excelsior is an unincorporated community in Upshur County, West Virginia, United States. It is located on County Route 151 along the Left Fork of Sand Run.
