= Benton Township, Crawford County, Missouri =

Inactive township in the US state of Missouri

Coordinates: 38.0779973°N 91.3749842°W

Benton Township is an inactive township in Crawford County, in the U.S. state of Missouri. It contains the census-designated place of Indian Lake.

Benton Township most likely was named after Thomas Hart Benton, a state legislator.
