= Benton Township, Osage County, Missouri =

Inactive township in the US state of Missouri

Coordinates: 38.6267869°N 91.7458507°W

Benton Township is an inactive township in Osage County, in the U.S. state of Missouri.

Benton Township has the name of Senator Thomas Hart Benton.
