= Benton Township, Linn County, Missouri =

Township in the American state of Missouri

Coordinates: 39°59′29″N 93°10′26″W

Benton Township is a township in Linn County, in the U.S. state of Missouri.

Benton Township was established in 1838, and most likely was named after Thomas Hart Benton, a U.S. Senator from Missouri.
