= Imko's =

Coordinates: 52°27′34.88″N 4°35′39.59″E

- Interactive map of Imko's

Restaurant information
- Established: 1994
- Closed: 2004
- Head chef: Imko Binnerts
- Location: Halkade 9c, IJmuiden, 1976 DC, Netherlands

Restaurant Imko's is a defunct restaurant in IJmuiden, Netherlands. It was a fine dining restaurant that was awarded one Michelin star in 1999 and retained that rating until 2003. Due to deterioration of the port area where the restaurant started suffering. Owner Imko Binnerts tried to sell the restaurant in 2003 but failed, seeing the restaurant go bankrupt in 2004. The building itself was demolished in 2007.

Owner and head chef of the restaurant was Imko Binnerts. He is a chef specializing in fresh fish and seafood.

== See also ==
- List of Michelin starred restaurants in the Netherlands
