= Excelsior Mountains =

Mountain range in Nevada, United States

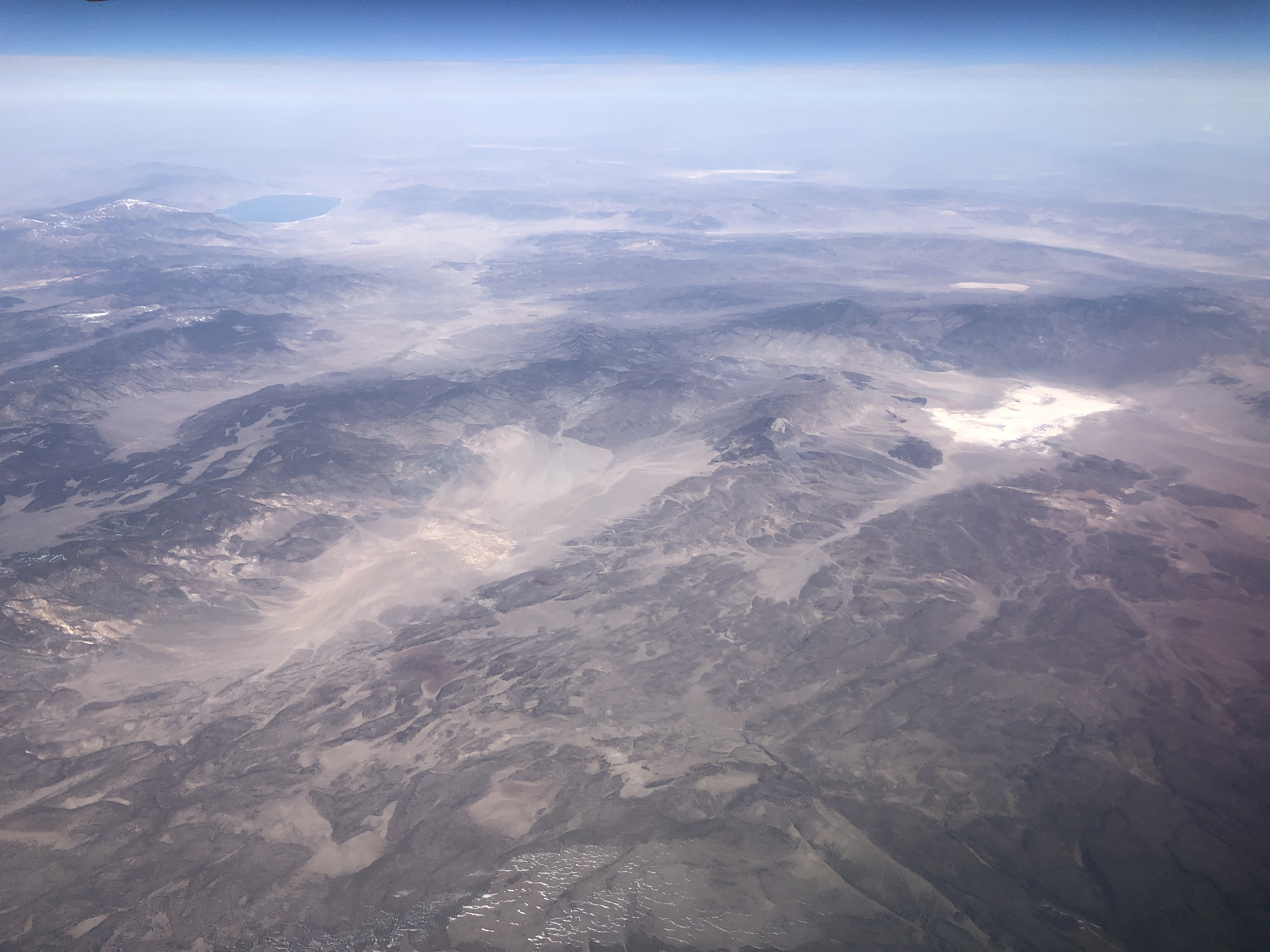
- View of the Excelsior Mountains (left to right across the center) from an airplane flying to the south

Highest point
- Elevation: 2,407 m (7,897 ft)

Geography
- Location within Nevada
- Country: United States
- State: Nevada
- District: Mineral County
- Range coordinates: 38°16′45.731″N 118°26′11.464″W
- Topo map: USGS Rattlesnake Flat

The Excelsior Mountains are located in western Nevada in the United States. The range stretches in an east-west direction in Mineral County southwest of the town of Mina, Nevada. The mountains reach an elevation of 8,805 feet at Moho Mountain in the southeastern part of the range. The Humboldt–Toiyabe National Forest lies at the western end of the Excelsior Mountains.
