= Excelsior, Sauk County, Wisconsin =

Town of Excelsior, Wisconsin
- Town
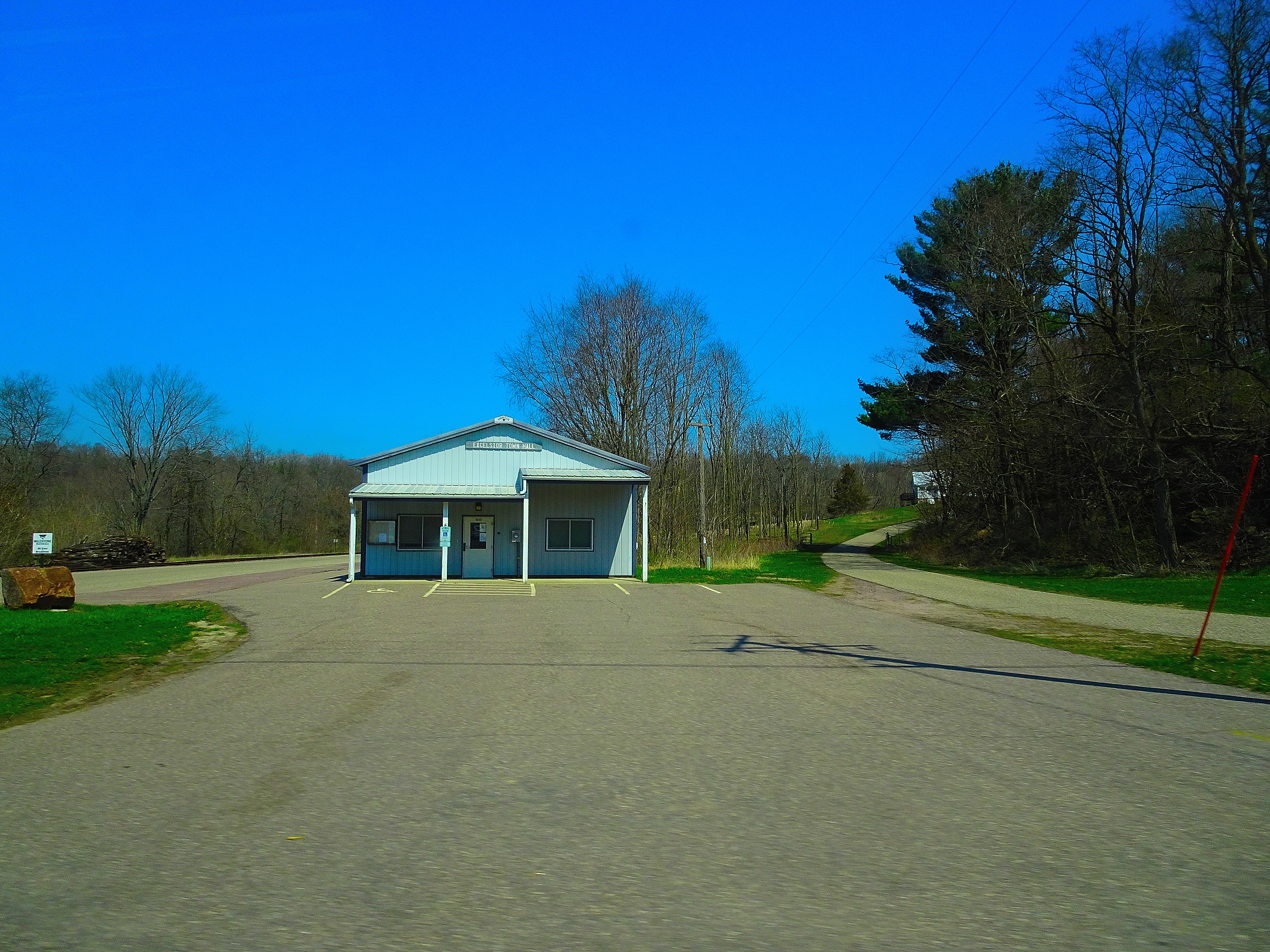
- Town hall

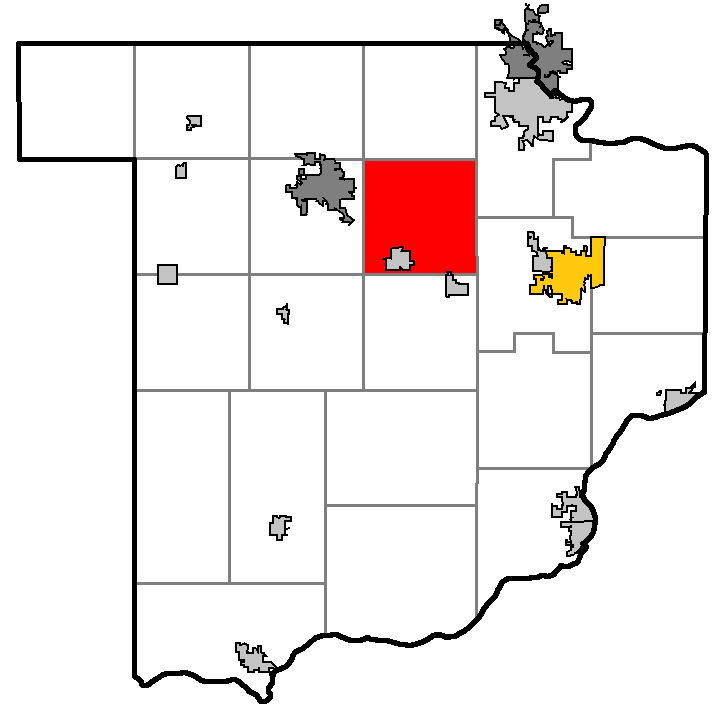
- Location of the Town of Excelsior, within Sauk County, Wisconsin

- Location of Sauk County, Wisconsin
- Coordinates: 43°30′45″N 89°53′40″W
- Country: United States
- State: Wisconsin
- County: Sauk

Area
  - Total: 34.0 sq mi (88.0 km^{2})
  - Land: 33.9 sq mi (87.8 km^{2})
  - Water: 0.077 sq mi (0.2 km^{2})
- Elevation: 909 ft (277 m)

Population (2020)
  - Total: 1,603
  - Density: 47.3/sq mi (18.3/km^{2})
- Time zone: UTC-6 (Central (CST))
  - Summer (DST): UTC-5 (CDT)
- Area code: 608
- FIPS code: 55-24675
- GNIS feature ID: 1583180
- Website: https://townofexcelsiorwi.gov/

The Town of Excelsior is a located in Sauk County, Wisconsin, United States. The population was 1,603 at the 2020 census.

== Geography ==
According to the United States Census Bureau, the town has a total area of 34.0 square miles (88.0 km^{2}), of which 33.9 square miles (87.8 km^{2}) is land and 0.1 square mile (0.2 km^{2}) (0.26%) is water.

== Demographics ==
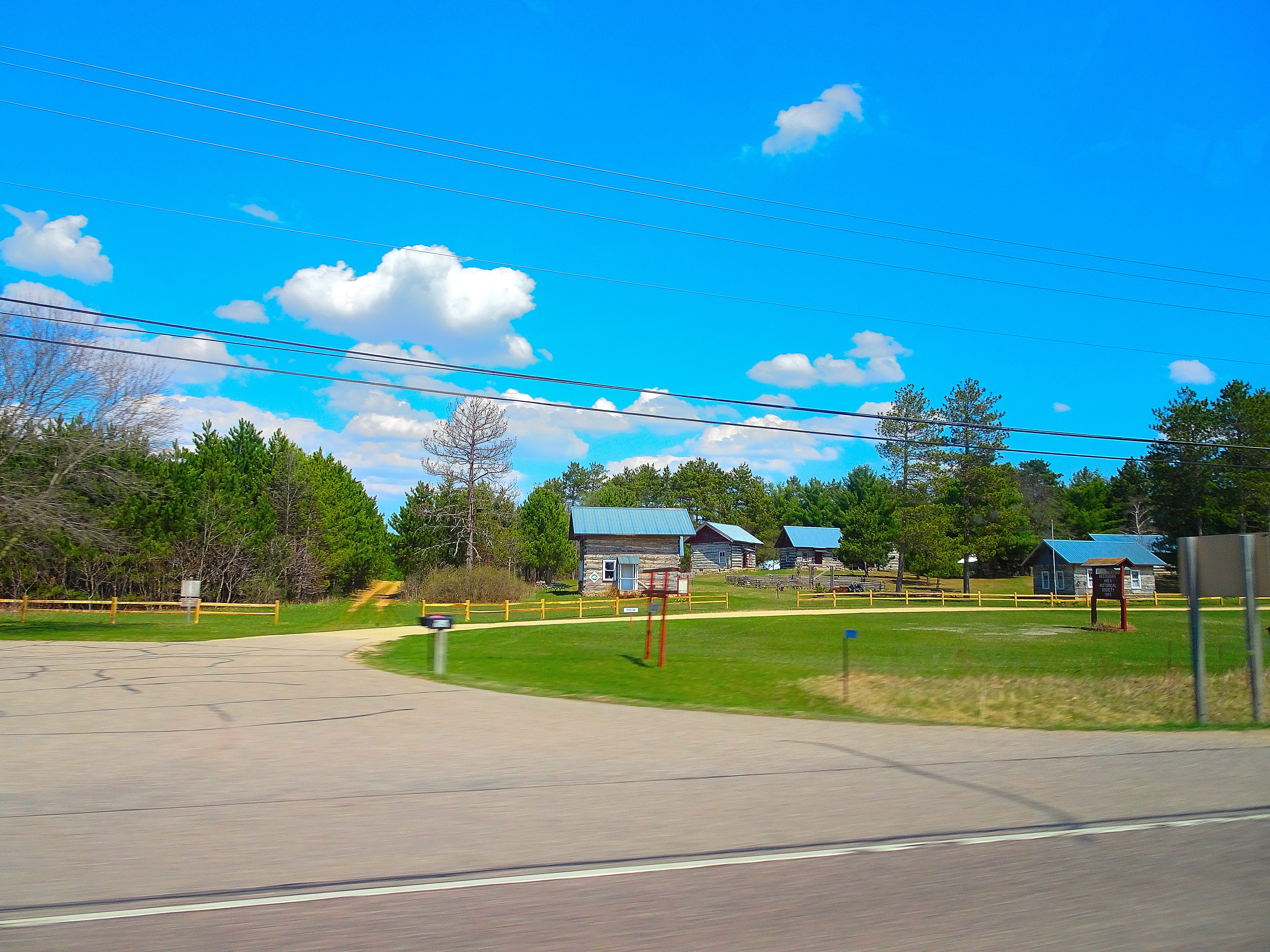
Pioneer Log Village Museum in Excelsior, April 2015

As of the census of 2000, there were 1,410 people, 527 households, and 427 families residing in the town. The population density was 41.6 people per square mile (16.1/km^{2}). There were 558 housing units at an average density of 16.5 per square mile (6.4/km^{2}). The racial makeup of the town was 98.09% White, 0.85% Native American, 0.28% Asian, and 0.78% from two or more races. Hispanic or Latino of any race were 0.35% of the population.

There were 527 households, out of which 32.1% had children under the age of 18 living with them, 72.3% were married couples living together, 3.8% had a female householder with no husband present, and 18.8% were non-families. 13.3% of all households were made up of individuals, and 4.7% had someone living alone who was 65 years of age or older. The average household size was 2.68 and the average family size was 2.91.

In the town, the population was spread out, with 23.6% under the age of 18, 6.6% from 18 to 24, 26.7% from 25 to 44, 31.3% from 45 to 64, and 11.7% who were 65 years of age or older. The median age was 42 years. For every 100 females, there were 111.7 males. For every 100 females age 18 and over, there were 108.3 males.

The median income for a household in the town was $54,375, and the median income for a family was $58,375. Males had a median income of $37,500 versus $22,073 for females. The per capita income for the town was $23,147. About 0.9% of families and 3.3% of the population were below the poverty line, including 2.0% of those under age 18 and 6.3% of those age 65 or over.

== See also ==
- List of towns in Wisconsin
