= Benton Township, Daviess County, Missouri =

Township in Daviess County, Missouri, U.S.

Benton Township
- Township
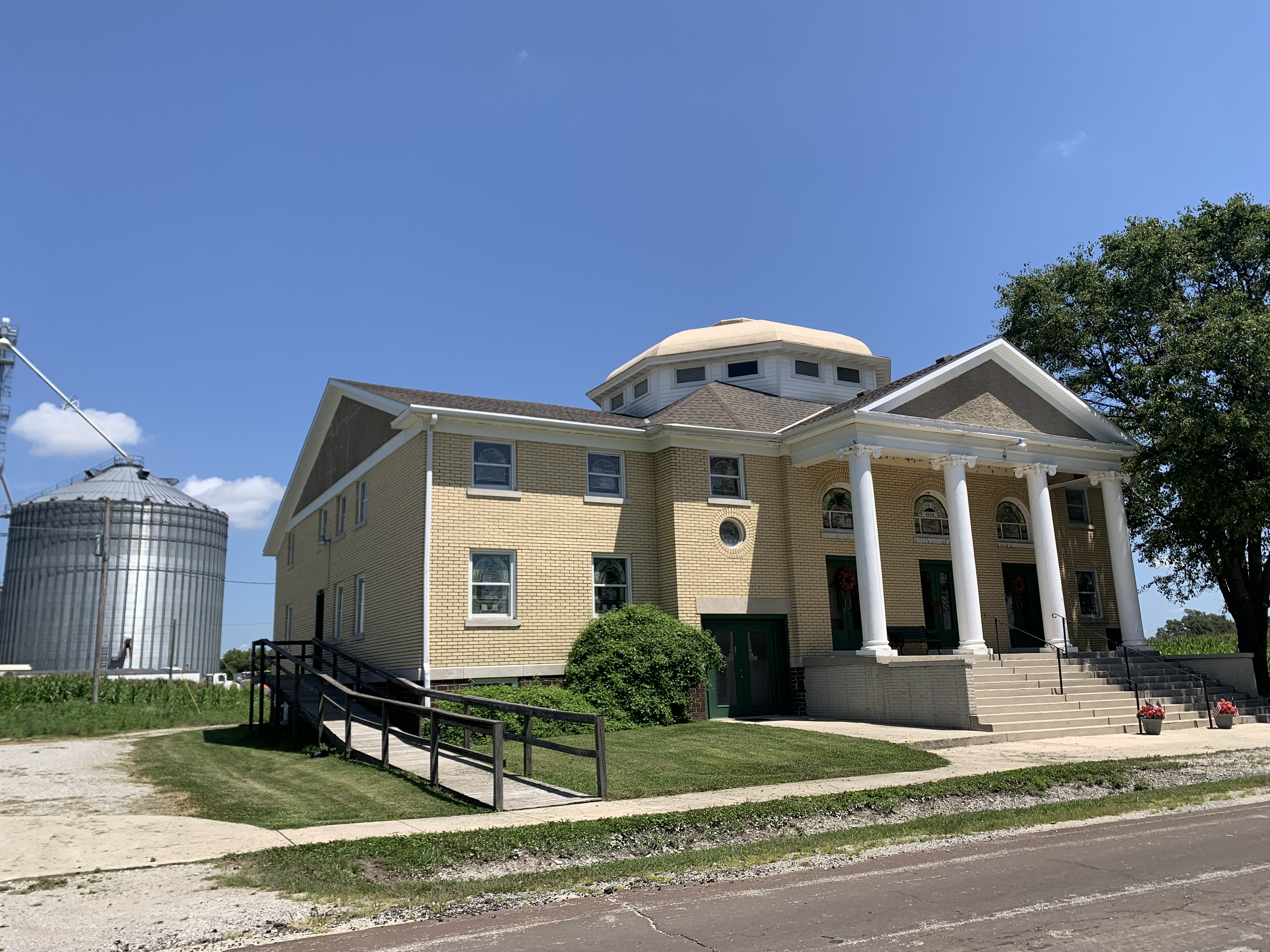
- Christian Church in Old Pattonsburg

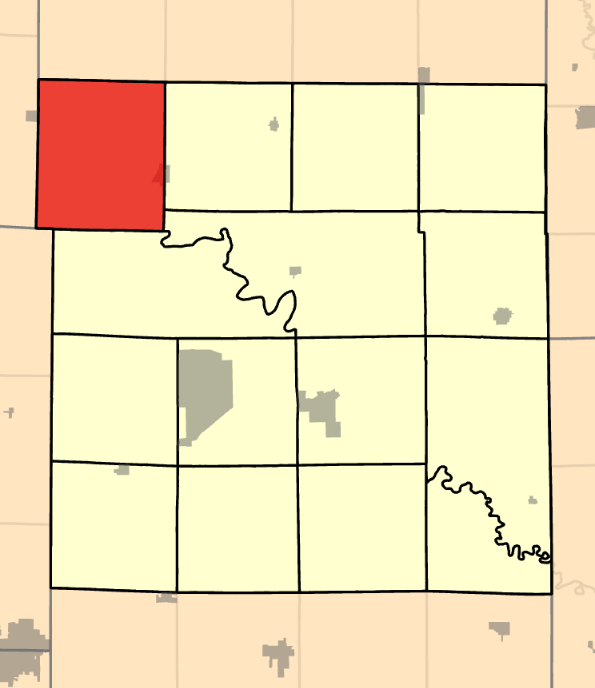
- Coordinates: 40°04′57″N 94°09′03″W
- Country: United States
- State: Missouri
- County: Daviess

Area
  - Total: 42.22 sq mi (109.3 km^{2})
  - Land: 41.63 sq mi (107.8 km^{2})
  - Water: 0.59 sq mi (1.5 km^{2}) 1.4%
- Elevation: 791 ft (241 m)

Population (2020)
  - Total: 497
  - Density: 11.9/sq mi (4.6/km^{2})
- FIPS code: 29-06104636
- GNIS feature ID: 766576

Benton Township is a township in Daviess County, Missouri, United States. At the 2020 census, its population was 497.

Benton Township has the name of Thomas Hart Benton, a Missouri senator.
