= Benton Township, Wayne County, Missouri =

Township in Wayne County, Missouri, U.S.

Coordinates: 37.1783°N 90.6917°W

Benton Township is an inactive township in Wayne County, Missouri, United States.

Benton Township has the name of Thomas Hart Benton, a state legislator.
