= Benton Township, Howell County, Missouri =

Township in Howell County, Missouri, U.S.

Coordinates: 36.5861°N 92.0247°W

Benton Township is an inactive township in Howell County, in the U.S. state of Missouri.

Benton Township has the name of the local Benton family.
