= Benton Township, Atchison County, Missouri =

Township in Atchison County, Missouri, U.S.

Benton Township
- Township
- Coordinates: 40°19′37″N 95°34′42″W
- Country: United States
- State: Missouri
- County: Atchison

Area
  - Total: 19.82 sq mi (51.3 km^{2})
  - Land: 19.28 sq mi (49.9 km^{2})
  - Water: 0.54 sq mi (1.4 km^{2}) 2.72%
- Elevation: 876 ft (267 m)

Population (2020)
  - Total: 17
  - Density: 0.9/sq mi (0.35/km^{2})
- FIPS code: 29-00504582
- GNIS feature ID: 766230

Benton Township is a township in Atchison County, Missouri, United States. At the 2020 census, its population was 17.

== History ==
Benton Township was established in May 1858 after being split from Nishnabotna Township. It was named after Thomas Hart Benton, a Missouri senator. Templeton Township was split off from Benton Township in February 1870. A ferry in the southeastern reaches of the township crossed the Missouri River near the mouth of the Nishnabotna River.

== Geography ==
Benton Township covers an area of 19.82 square miles (51.3 km^{2}) and contains no incorporated settlements. There is one cemetery, Landgon Lutheran.

The eastern boundary of the township was the old channel of the Nishnabotna River, and the western boundary of the township is formed by the Missouri River. The stream of State Line Slough runs through this northwestmost portion township.

== Transportation ==
The following highways travel through the township:

- Interstate 29
- Route 111
- Route E
- Route U
