= America discography =

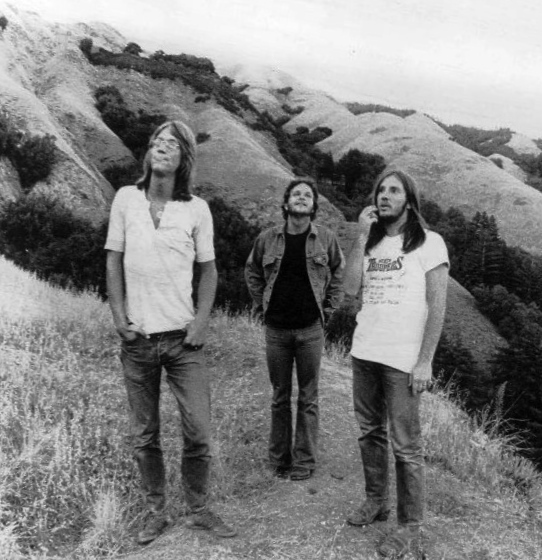
- The trio in 1976
- Studio albums: 23
- Live albums: 14
- Compilation albums: 23
- Singles: 47
- #1 Singles: 5

America is an American rock group that has released 23 studio albums, 14 live albums and 23 compilation albums. They have also issued 47 singles, including two Billboard Hot 100 and three Adult Contemporary number ones.

America's best-known song is their 1972 debut single, "A Horse with No Name". It was the lead-off single to their self-titled debut album and became their first number one on the Billboard Hot 100. The song was also a Top 5 hit in the United Kingdom reaching number three on the UK Singles Chart. Throughout the 1970s and 1980s, America had charted eleven Top 40 singles in the United States. However, in the 1990s, their popularity began to fade. They have not had a Billboard-charted single in the United States since 1984, though "Young Moon" charted in Germany in 1994, peaking at number 59 on the country's Media Control Charts along with hitting number 33 on the Radio & Records AC Airplay Top 40 charts. Additionally, in 1998, "From a Moving Train" charted on the Radio & Records AC Airplay Top 40 chart for six weeks and peaked at number 25, along with being number 84 for the year. "Winter Wonderland" peaked on the same chart at number 26 in 2002.

== Studio albums ==
=== 1970s ===
Title	Album details	Peak chart positions										Certifications (sales threshold)
Title	Album details	US	AUS	CAN	IT	NOR	NZ	JPN	SPA	SWE	UK	Certifications (sales threshold)
America	Release date: January 1972; Label: Warner Bros. Records; Formats: LP, 8-track, Cassette	1	3	1	—	22	—	9	6	—	14	CAN: Platinum; JPN: 44,000; US: Platinum
Homecoming	Release date: November 15, 1972; Label: Warner Bros. Records; Formats: LP, 8-track, Cassette	9	17	6	12	—	—	42	17	—	21	AUS: Gold; CAN: Gold; JPN: 16,000; US: Platinum
Hat Trick	Release date: October 26, 1973; Label: Warner Bros. Records; Formats: LP, 8-track, Cassette	28	24	44	—	—	—	—	24	—	41	UK: Silver
Holiday	Release date: June 26, 1974; Label: Warner Bros. Records; Formats: LP, 8-track, Cassette	3	25	3	—	—	—	—	—	—	—	UK: Silver; US: Gold
Hearts	Release date: March 19, 1975; Label: Warner Bros. Records; Formats: LP, 8-track, Cassette	4	17	3	—	—	12	74	—	—	—	CAN: Gold; JPN: 6,000; UK: Silver; US: Gold
Hideaway	Release date: 9 April 1976; Label: Warner Bros. Records; Formats: LP, 8-track, Cassette	11	12	10	—	—	12	62	—	48	—	JPN: 7,000; US: Gold
Harbor	Release date: March 1977; Label: Warner Bros. Records; Formats: LP, 8-track, Cassette	21	19	16	—	13	31	—	—	33	—	
Silent Letter	Release date: June 15, 1979; Label: Capitol Records; Formats: LP, 8-track, Cassette	110	51	80	—	—	—	—	—	—	—	
"—" denotes releases that did not chart

=== 1980s ===
Title	Album details	Peak positions				Certifications (sales threshold)
Title	Album details	US	AUS	IT	JPN	Certifications (sales threshold)
Alibi	Release date: August 15, 1980; Label: Capitol Records; Formats: LP, 8-track, Cassette	142	100	2	—	
View from the Ground	Release date: August 1982; Label: Capitol Records; Formats: LP, Cassette	41	46	10	43	JPN: 19,150
The Last Unicorn (with Jimmy Webb and the London Symphony Orchestra)	Release date: November 19, 1982; Label: Virgin Records; Formats: LP, Cassette	—	—	—	—	
Your Move	Release date: June 3, 1983; Label: Capitol Records; Formats: LP, Cassette	81	66	16	58	JPN: 9,030
The Lonely Guy Soundtrack	Release date: January 27, 1984; Label: Universal; Formats: LP, Cassette	—	—	—	—	
Perspective	Release date: September 21, 1984; Label: Capitol Records; Formats: LP, Cassette	185	—	—	—	
"—" denotes releases that did not chart.

=== 1990s ===
Title	Album details
Hourglass	Release date: May 17, 1994; Label: American Gramaphone; Formats: CD, Cassette
Human Nature	Release date: September 1998; Label: Oxygen Records; Formats: CD, Cassette

=== 2000s, 2010s ===
Title	Album details	Peak positions
Title	Album details	US
Holiday Harmony	Release date: October 2002; Label: Rhino Records; Formats: CD	—
Here & Now	Release date: January 16, 2007; Label: Burgundy Records; Formats: CD, music download	52
Back Pages	Release date: July 26, 2011; Label: E1 Music; Formats: CD, music download	—
Lost & Found	Release date: May 5, 2015; Label: America Records; Formats: CD, music download	—
Archives, Vol 1	Release date: November 24, 2015; Label: America Records; Formats: CD, music download	—
"—" denotes releases that did not chart.

== Compilation albums ==
=== 1970–1999 ===
Title	Album details	Peak chart positions					Certifications (sales threshold)
Title	Album details	US	AUS	CAN	NZ	UK	Certifications (sales threshold)
History: America's Greatest Hits	Release date: November 1975; Label: Warner Bros. Records; Formats: LP, 8-track, cassette	3	11	5	3	60	AUS: 6× Platinum; CAN: Platinum; UK: Silver; US: 4× Platinum
America's Gold	Release date: 1981; Label: Warner Special Products; Formats: LP, cassette	—	—	—	—	—	
Encore: More Greatest Hits	Release date: June 24, 1991; Label: Rhino Records; Formats: CD, cassette	—	—	—	—	—	
Ventura Highway & Other Favorites	Release date: March 21, 1992; Label: EMI; Formats: CD, cassette	—	—	—	—	—	
Premium Gold Collection	Release date: April 1, 1996; Label: EMI; Formats: CD, cassette	—	—	—	—	—	
The Legendary America	Release date: 1998; Label: Capitol; Formats: CD, cassette	—	—	—	—	—	
"—" denotes releases that did not chart.

=== 2000s ===
Title	Album details	Peak chart positions				Certifications (sales threshold)
Title	Album details	US	AUS	NZ	UK	Certifications (sales threshold)
Highway	Release date: July 2000; Label: Rhino Records; Formats: CD, cassette	—	—	—	—	
The Definitive America	Release date: July 17, 2001; Label: Rhino Records; Formats: CD, cassette	—	19	2	87	AUS: Platinum
The Complete Greatest Hits	Release date: August 2001; Label: Rhino Records; Formats: CD, cassette	152	—	—	—	
A Horse With No Name & Other Hits	Release date: September 14, 2004; Label: Rhino Records; Formats: CD, cassette	—	—	—	—	
The Definitive Pop Collection	Release date: September 12, 2006; Label: Rhino Records; Formats: CD	—	—	—	—	
Only the Best of America	Release date: September 30, 2008; Label: Collectables; Formats: CD	—	—	—	—	
Collectables Classics	Release date: March 29, 2010; Label: Collectables; Formats: CD	—	—	—	—	
Original Album Series	Release date: August 27, 2013; Label: Rhino Records; Formats: CD	—	—	—	—	
Playlist: The Very Best of America	Release date: June 15, 2015; Label: SBME SPECIAL MKTS; Formats: CD	—	—	—	—	
The Warner Bros. Years 1971–1977	Release date: July 17, 2015; Label: Rhino Records; Formats: CD	—	—	—	—	
An Introduction To : America	Release date: May 12, 2017; Label: Rhino Records; Formats: CD, music download	—	—	—	—	
The Archives: America	Release date: July 13, 2018; Label: Broadcast Archive; Formats: CD	—	—	—	—	
The Capitol Years (box set)	Release date: May 17, 2019; Label: Capitol; Formats: CD	—	—	—	—	
50th Anniversary: The Collection	Release date: July 12, 2019; Label: Rhino/Warner Bros.; Formats: CD, Vinyl, Download	94 (Note: Billboard Top Current Album Sales); 13 (Note: Billboard Folk Albums)	—	—	—	
50th Anniversary: Golden Hits	Release date: July 12, 2019; Label: Rhino/Warner Bros.; Formats: CD, Download	—	—	—	—	
America 50: Half Century Box Set	Release date: September 11, 2020; Label: Gonzo Import; Formats: CD/DVD	—	—	—	—	
Now Playing	Release date: January 5, 2024; Label: Rhino/Warner Bros.; Formats: Vinyl	—	—	—	—	
"—" denotes releases that did not chart.

== Live albums ==
Title	Album details	Peak chart positions	
Title	Album details	US	AUS
Live	Release date: October 1977; Label: Warner Bros. Records; Formats: LP, 8-track, cassette	129	74
Live in Central Park	Release date: 1981; Label: Pioneer; Formats: Laser Disc, VHS, DVD, CD	—	—
In Concert	Release date: July 1985; Label: Capitol Records; Formats: LP, cassette, CD	—	—
Horse with No Name	Release date: 1995; Label: MasterTone Records; Formats: CD	—	—
In Concert (King Biscuit)	Release date: July 1995; Label: Capitol Records; Formats: CD	—	—
The Grand Cayman Concert	Release date: November 2002; Label: self-released; Formats: CD	—	—
In Concert - Live at the Sydney Opera House	Release date: May 23, 2006; Label: Rhino; Formats: DVD, CD	—	—
Live in Concert: Wildwood Springs	Release date: December 28, 2008; Label: America; Formats: CD, music download	—	—
Sigma Sound Studio 1972	Release date: September 11, 2015; Label: All Access; Formats: CD, music download	—	—
Universal Amphitheatre L.A. 1978	Release date: March 11, 2016; Label: Zip City; Formats: CD, music download	—	—
Live Whisky A-Go-Go 1972	Release date: May 11, 2018; Label: Rox Vox; Formats: CD, music download	—	—
Live in Central Park 1979	Release date: August 9, 2019; Label: America Records; Formats: CD, DVD	—	—
Live at the London Palladium	Release date: Nov 1, 2019; Label: America Records; Formats: DVD, CD	—	—
Live From The Hollywood Bowl 1975	Release date: Apr 20, 2024; Label: Primary Wave Music; Formats: Vinyl, CD	2 (Note: Billboard Classical Crossover Albums); 8 (Note: Billboard Classical Albums)	—
"—" denotes releases that did not chart

== Bootleg albums ==
Title	Album details
On the Road America / Eagles Live	Release date: September 3, 1974; Label: Phonygraph; Formats: LP; Recording of America and The Eagles’ performances on the “In Concert” TV show. America is on side 1 and The Eagles are on side 2.
Heard	Release date: 1997; Label: Home Rolled; Formats: CD; Contains some studio and concert recordings.
Happenstance	Release date: 1998; Label: Marshall; Formats: CD; Contains concert recordings from the early 1970s.
Honor Bound	Release date: 1998; Label: Marshall; Formats: CD; Contains the Live In Central Park performance from 1979.
Ride That Highway in the Sky Volume 1	Release date: 2014; Label: Marshall; Formats: CD; Concert recordings from the early and mid-1970s.
Ride That Highway in the Sky Volume 2	Release date: 2014; Label: Marshall; Formats: CD; Concert recordings from the late 1970s.

== Singles ==
=== 1970s singles ===
Year	Single	Peak chart positions										Notes	B-side From same album as A-side except where indicated	Album
Year	Single	US	US AC	CAN	CAN AC	AUS	JPN	NL	NZ	UK	ZIM	Notes	B-side From same album as A-side except where indicated	Album
1972	"A Horse with No Name"	1	3	1	7	2	16	12	—	3	7	US: Gold; UK: Platinum	"Everyone I Meet Is from California" (US) (From Encore: More Greatest Hits) "Sandman" (UK, AUS, FR)	America
1972	"I Need You"	9	7	5	—	81	64	—	18	—	16		"Riverside"	America
1972	"Ventura Highway"	8	3	5	42	28	—	—	12	43	—	UK: Gold	"Saturn Nights"	Homecoming
1973	"Don't Cross the River"	35	23	49	21	94	—	—	—	—	—		"To Each His Own"	Homecoming
1973	"Only in Your Heart"	62	—	—	—	—	—	—	—	—	—		"Moon Song"	Homecoming
1973	"Muskrat Love"	67	11	68	30	—	—	—	—	—	—		"Cornwall Blank" (from Homecoming)	Hat Trick
1973	"Rainbow Song"	102 (Note: Cashbox Singles Chart.)	—	—	—	—	—	—	—	—	—		"Willow Tree Lullaby"	Hat Trick
1974	"Green Monkey"	—	—	—	—	—	—	—	—	—	—	Featuring Joe Walsh on lead guitar	"She's Gonna Let You Down"	Hat Trick
1974	"Tin Man"	4	1	7	5	46	—	—	—	—	—	First single produced by George Martin	"In the Country"	Holiday
1974	"Lonely People"	5	1	16	3	43	—	—	—	—	—		"Mad Dog"	Holiday
1975	"Simple Life"	—	—	—	—	—	—	—	—	—	—		"Lonely People" (from Holiday)	Non-album track
1975	"Sister Golden Hair"	1	5	11	3	28	73	—	26	—	1		"Midnight"	Hearts
1975	"Daisy Jane"	20	4	16	2	—	—	—	—	—	—		"Tomorrow"	Hearts
1975	"Woman Tonight"	44	41	69	—	—	—	—	—	—	—		"Bell Tree"	Hearts
1976	"Today's the Day"	23	1	16	5	55	—	—	—	—	—		"Hideaway Part II"	Hideaway
1976	"Amber Cascades"	75	17	86	17	—	—	—	—	—	—		"Who Loves You"	Hideaway
1976	"She's a Liar"	—	—	—	—	—	—	—	—	—	—		"She's Beside You"	Hideaway
1976	"Jet Boy Blue"	—	—	—	—	—	—	—	—	—	—		"Watership Down"	Hideaway
1977	"God of the Sun"	—	—	—	—	—	—	—	—	—	—		"Down to the Water"	Harbor
1977	"Don't Cry Baby"	—	—	—	—	—	—	—	—	—	—		"Monster"	Harbor
1977	"Slow Down"	—	—	—	—	—	—	—	—	—	—		"Sarah"	Harbor
1979	"California Dreamin'"	56	—	—	—	—	84	—	—	—	—		"See It My Way" by FDR	California Dreaming (soundtrack)
1979	"Only Game in Town"	107	—	—	—	—	—	—	—	—	—		"High in the City"	Silent Letter
1979	"All My Life"	—	48	—	—	—	—	—	—	—	—		"One Morning"	Silent Letter
1979	"All Around"	93 (Note: Record World Singles Chart.)	45	—	—	—	—	—	—	—	—	Last single produced by George Martin	"1960"	Silent Letter
"—" denotes releases that did not chart. US charts are Billboard unless otherwise noted.

=== 1980s singles ===
Year	Single	Peak chart positions											B-side From same album as A-side except where indicated	Album
Year	Single	US	US AC	CAN	CAN AC	AUS	GER	IT	JPN	NL	NZ	UK	B-side From same album as A-side except where indicated	Album
1980	"You Could Have Been the One"	114	—	—	—	—	—	—	—	—	—	—	"Catch That Train"	Alibi
1980	"Hangover"	—	—	—	—	—	—	—	—	—	—	—	"One in a Million"	Alibi
1980	"Survival"	—	—	—	—	—	—	2	—	—	—	—	Italy-"Only Game in Town" (from Silent Letter); Germany-"Catch That Train"	Alibi
1982	"You Can Do Magic"	8	5	37	13	30	—	23	68	—	12	59	"Even the Score"	View from the Ground
1982	"Right Before Your Eyes"	45	16	—	22	—	—	—	—	—	—	—	"Inspector Mills"	View from the Ground
1982	"Jody"	—	—	—	—	—	—	—	—	—	—	—	"Inspector Mills"	View from the Ground
1983	"The Border"	33	4	39	1	—	—	—	—	22	—	—	"Sometimes Lovers"(from View From The Ground)	Your Move
1983	"Cast the Spirit"	—	—	—	—	—	—	—	—	—	—	—	"My Dear"	Your Move
1984	"The Last Unicorn"	—	—	—	—	—	38	—	—	—	—	—	"Man's Road"	The Last Unicorn (soundtrack)
1984	"Special Girl"	106	15	—	7	—	—	—	—	—	—	—	"Unconditional Love"	Perspective
1984	"Can't Fall Asleep to a Lullaby" (featuring Steve Perry)	—	26	—	—	—	—	—	—	—	—	—	"Fallin' Off the World"	Perspective
1989	"5th Avenue"	—	—	—	—	—	—	—	—	—	—	—		Perspective
"—" denotes releases that did not chart. US charts are Billboard unless otherwise noted.

=== 1990s singles ===
Year	Single	Peak positions		B-side	Album
Year	Single	US AC	GER	B-side	Album
1990	"The Last Two to Dance"	—	—	"The Last Two to Dance" (instrumental)	Non-album track
1991	"Nothing's So Far Away (As Yesterday)"	—	—		Encore: More Greatest Hits
1994	"Young Moon"	33 (Note: Radio & Records Adult Contemporary Chart.)	79	"Call of the Wild"	Hourglass
1994	"Hope"	—	—	"Whole Wide World"	Hourglass
1994	"Greenhouse"	—	—		Hourglass
1995	"Hark! The Herald Angels Sing"	—	—		various Christmas compilations
1998	"From a Moving Train" (single edit)	25	—	"From a Moving Train" (album version)	Human Nature
1998	"Wednesday Morning"	—	—	"Town and Country"	Human Nature
1998	"Moment to Moment"	—	—		Human Nature
"—" denotes releases that did not chart. US chart information Billboard unless otherwise noted.

=== 2000s–2020s singles ===
Year	Single/Track	Peak positions		Album
Year	Single/Track	US AC	US Rock Dig.	Album
2002	"Winter Wonderland"	26	—	Holiday Harmony
2007	"Chasing the Rainbow"	13 (Note: FMQB Top 40 Chart.)	—	Here & Now
2007	"Ride On"	—	—	Here & Now
2011	"A Horse with No Name"	—	49	The Complete Greatest Hits
2015	"Driving"	—	99	Lost & Found
2019	"Ventura Highway"	—	24	50th Anniversary: The Collection
2020	"Remembering"	—	—	America 50: Half Century Box Set
"—" denotes releases that did not chart. US chart information Billboard unless otherwise noted.

=== Billboard year-end positions ===
Year	Song	Year-end position
1972	"Horse with No Name"	27
1972	"I Need You"	71
1972	"Ventura Highway"	94
1974	"Tin Man"	85
1975	"Sister Golden Hair"	33
1975	"Lonely People"	83
1982	"You Can Do Magic"	65
