= The Definitive America =

Compilation album by America
- Released: July 17, 2001
- Recorded: 1971–83
- Studio: Abbey Road Studios, Sunset Sound Recorders
- Genre: Pop; rock; soft rock
- Length: 76:47
- Label: Warner Bros., Rhino
- Producer: George Martin, America, Bill Inglot, David McLees, Stuart Batsford

America chronology
Highway (2000)	The Definitive America (2001)	The Complete Greatest Hits (2001)

Professional ratings
Review scores
Source	Rating
AllMusic	3/5 stars
Rolling Stone Album Guide	2.5/5 stars

The Definitive America is a compilation album by American rock band America, released in 2001. The album was certified Platinum in Australia.

== Track listing ==
No.	Title	Writer(s)	Album	Length
1.	"A Horse with No Name"	Dewey Bunnell	America (1971)	4:13
2.	"I Need You"	Gerry Beckley	America (1971)	3:06
3.	"Sandman"	Dewey Bunnell	America (1971)	5:07
4.	"Ventura Highway"	Dewey Bunnell	Homecoming (1972)	3:32
5.	"Don't Cross the River"	Dan Peek	Homecoming (1972)	2:32
6.	"To Each His Own"	Gerry Beckley	Homecoming (1972)	3:13
7.	"Only In Your Heart"	Gerry Beckley	Homecoming (1972)	3:18
8.	"Muskrat Love"	Willis Alan Ramsey	Hat Trick (1973)	3:07
9.	"Rainbow Song"	Dewey Bunnell	Hat Trick (1973)	3:55
10.	"She's Gonna Let You Down"	Gerry Beckley	Hat Trick (1973)	3:41
11.	"Tin Man"	Dewey Bunnell	Holiday (1974)	3:28
12.	"Lonely People"	Dan Peek, Catherine Peek	Holiday (1974)	2:28
13.	"Sister Golden Hair"	Gerry Beckley	Hearts (1975)	3:19
14.	"Daisy Jane"	Gerry Beckley	Hearts (1975)	3:09
15.	"Woman Tonight"	Dan Peek	Hearts (1975)	2:22
16.	"Today's the Day"	Dan Peek	Hideaway (1976)	3:16
17.	"Amber Cascades"	Dewey Bunnell	Hideaway (1976)	2:50
18.	"God of the Sun"	Gerry Beckley	Harbor (1977)	3:16
19.	"Political Poachers"	Dewey Bunnell	Harbor (1977)	2:40
20.	"Survival"	Gerry Beckley	Alibi (1980)	3:14
21.	"The Last Unicorn"	Jimmy Webb	The Last Unicorn (1982)	3:09
22.	"You Can Do Magic"	Russ Ballard	View from the Ground (1982)	3:54
23.	"The Border"	Dewey Bunnell, Russ Ballard	Your Move (1983)	3:58
Total length:				1:16:47

== Personnel ==
- Gerry Beckley – lead and backing vocals, keyboards, guitars, bass, harmonica
- Dewey Bunnell – lead and backing vocals, guitars, percussion
- Dan Peek – lead and backing vocals, guitars, bass, keyboards, harmonica
- David Dickey – bass (tracks: 8 to 10, 13 to 19)
- Joe Osborne – bass (tracks: 4 to 7)
- Chris McCracken – congas (tracks: 8 to 10)
- Hal Blaine – drums, percussion (tracks: 4 to 10)
- Willie Leacox – drums, percussion (tracks: 11 to 19)
- Robert Margouleff – synthesizer (tracks: 8 to 10)

== Charts ==
Chart (2001)	Peak position
Australia ARIA Charts	23
Italian Albums Chart	26
New Zealand Recorded Music NZ	2
UK Official Charts Company	87

== Certifications ==
Region	Certification	Certified units/sales
Australia (ARIA)	Platinum	70,000^{^}
^{^} Shipments figures based on certification alone.
