= Highway (America album) =

Highway: 30 Years Of America

Box set by America
- Released: July 2000
- Recorded: 1971–94
- Genre: Rock, folk rock, pop
- Length: 3:44:53
- Label: Rhino
- Producer: Various

America chronology
Human Nature (1998)	Highway: 30 Years Of America (2000)	The Definitive America (2001)

Professional ratings
Review scores
Source	Rating
AllMusic	4.5/5 stars
The Rolling Stone Album Guide	1/5 stars

Highway: 30 Years Of America is the third principal major label compilation album by American folk rock duo America, released by Rhino Records in 2000. The collection represented the first boxed set release of America's material. Originally, the collection was promoted as including four discs, including newly recorded material, but was scaled back to three discs shortly before release.

The resulting collection was heavily tilted toward the Warner Bros. releases, with the remainder of the group's career relegated to a portion of the third disc. No material from Human Nature, and only one track from Alibi, was included. All songs which charted on the Billboard Hot 100 chart are represented with the exception of the group's 1982 hit, "Right Before Your Eyes". The collection notably contains a demo of "Ventura Highway" prior to the addition of the famous guitar riff for which it is best known. Only two previously unreleased tracks were included in the 64-track set: "Mitchum Junction" and "James Holladay".

== Track listing ==
=== Disc One ===
No.	Title	Writer(s)	Length
1.	"Riverside"	Dewey Bunnell	3:06
2.	"A Horse with No Name"	Bunnell	4:14
3.	"I Need You"	Gerry Beckley	3:08
4.	"Rainy Day"	Dan Peek	2:57
5.	"Here"	Beckley	5:30
6.	"Three Roses"	Bunnell	3:56
7.	"Sandman"	Bunnell	5:10
8.	"Everyone I Meet Is From California"	Peek	3:06
9.	"Ventura Highway"	Bunnell	3:34
10.	"To Each His Own"	Beckley	3:15
11.	"Don't Cross The River"	Peek	2:32
12.	"Cornwall Blank"	Bunnell	4:22
13.	"Only In Your Heart"	Beckley	3:20
14.	"Saturn Nights"	Peek	3:34
15.	"Hat Trick"	Beckley, Bunnell, Peek	8:27
16.	"Molten Love"	Bunnell	3:11
17.	"It's Life"	Peek	4:02
18.	"Submarine Ladies" (unedited, alternate mix)	Beckley	3:43

=== Disc Two ===
No.	Title	Writer(s)	Length
1.	"Muskrat Love"	Willis Alan Ramsey	3:08
2.	"Green Monkey"	Bunnell	3:39
3.	"She's Gonna Let You Down" (single edit)	Beckley	3:42
4.	"Rainbow Song"	Bunnell	3:56
5.	"Tin Man"	Bunnell	3:29
6.	"Another Try"	Beckley	3:20
7.	"Lonely People"	Peek, Catherine Peek	2:29
8.	"Hollywood"	Bunnell	2:54
9.	"Baby It's Up To You"	Beckley	2:28
10.	"Old Man Took"	Bunnell	3:14
11.	"Simple Life"	Peek	2:14
12.	"Sister Golden Hair"	Beckley	3:20
13.	"Daisy Jane"	Beckley	3:11
14.	"Woman Tonight"	Peek	2:24
15.	"Who Loves You" (alternate mix)	Beckley	4:24
16.	"Lovely Night"	Beckley	2:35
17.	"Amber Cascades"	Bunnell	2:53
18.	"Can't You See"	Peek	2:24
19.	"Watership Down" (alternate mix)	Beckley	4:43
20.	"Letter" (alternate mix)	Bunnell	3:03
21.	"Today's the Day"	Peek	3:17
22.	"Sarah"	Beckley	2:45
23.	"Are You There"	Bunnell	2:54
24.	"God Of The Sun"	Beckley	3:16
25.	"Sergeant Darkness"	Beckley	2:55

=== Disc Three ===
No.	Title	Writer(s)	Length
1.	"California Dreamin'"	John Phillips/Michelle Phillips	2:47
2.	"All My Life"	Beckley	3:04
3.	"Only Game In Town"	Casey Kelly/Julie Didier/Lewis Anderson	4:12
4.	"1960"	Beckley	3:12
5.	"Survival"	Beckley	3:14
6.	"The Last Unicorn"	Jimmy Webb	3:08
7.	"You Can Do Magic"	Russ Ballard	5:12
8.	"Inspector Mills"	Beckley	5:12
9.	"My Dear"	Bunnell	4:22
10.	"The Border"	Ballard, Bunnell	4:00
11.	"She's A Runaway"	Ballard	4:10
12.	"(Can't Fall Asleep To A) Lullaby"	Bunnell, Steve Perry, Robert Haimer, Bill Mumy	3:49
13.	"Special Girl"	Eddie Schwartz, David Tyson	3:47
14.	"Nothing's So Far Away (As Yesterday)"	Bunnell, Haimer, Mumy	3:35
15.	"Young Moon"	Beckley, Bunnell	4:32
16.	"Greenhouse"	Bunnell, Haimer, Mumy	2:41
17.	"Mitchum Junction" (demo)	Bunnell	2:09
18.	"Satan" (demo)	Peek	3:57
19.	"Ventura Highway" (demo)	Bunnell	3:07
20.	"James Holladay" (demo)	Peek	3:27
21.	"Riverside" (demo)	Bunnell	2:47

("Satan" was released on America as "Donkey Jaw".)
