= The Complete Greatest Hits (America album) =

Greatest hits album by America
- Released: August 21, 2001
- Recorded: 1971–2001
- Genre: Pop, rock
- Label: Rhino
- Producer: Various

America chronology
The Definitive America (2001)	The Complete Greatest Hits (2001)	Holiday Harmony (2002)

Professional ratings
Review scores
Source	Rating
AllMusic	4.5/5 stars
The Rolling Stone Album Guide	2.5/5 stars

The Complete Greatest Hits is the fourth principal major label greatest hits album by American folk rock duo America, released by Rhino Records in 2001. This is the first compilation to feature all 17 of the group's Billboard Hot 100 singles. The album was intended to update and expand upon History: America's Greatest Hits. It includes two new tracks released exclusive to this collection. This was the group's first album to chart since 1984's Perspective, reaching No. 152 on the Billboard albums chart.

== Track listing ==
1. "A Horse with No Name", from America (Dewey Bunnell) (4:11)
2. "Sandman", from America (Bunnell) (5:08)
3. "I Need You", from America (Gerry Beckley) (3:06)
4. "Everyone I Meet Is From California", from Encore: More Greatest Hits (originally released as the B-side of A Horse with No Name) (Dan Peek) (3:05)
5. "Ventura Highway", from Homecoming (Bunnell) (3:33)
6. "Don't Cross the River", from Homecoming (Dan Peek) (2:32)
7. "Only In Your Heart", from Homecoming (Beckley) (3:19)
8. "Muskrat Love", from Hat Trick (Willis Alan Ramsey) (3:06)
9. "Another Try", from Holiday (Beckley) (3:18)
10. "Tin Man", from Holiday (Bunnell) (3:27)
11. "Lonely People", from Holiday (Catherine Peek, Dan Peek) (2:28)
12. "Sister Golden Hair", from Hearts (Beckley) (3:16)
13. "Daisy Jane", from Hearts (Beckley) (3:10)
14. "Woman Tonight", from Hearts (Peek) (2:23)
15. "Today's the Day", from Hideaway (Peek) (3:16)
16. "Amber Cascades", from Hideaway (Bunnell) (2:53)
17. "California Dreamin'" (John Phillips, Michelle Phillips) (2:46)
18. "You Can Do Magic", from View From The Ground (Russ Ballard) (3:52)
19. "Right Before Your Eyes", from View From The Ground (Ian Thomas) (3:53)
20. "The Border", from Your Move (Ballard, Bunnell) (4:01)
21. "World of Light" (new track) (Beckley) (4:50)
22. "Paradise" (new track) (Beckley, Bunnell) (3:39)
