= America Live (album) =

Live

Live album by America
- Released: December 1977
- Recorded: July 24, 1977
- Venue: Greek Theater, Los Angeles
- Genre: Pop; rock
- Length: 46:28
- Label: Warner Bros.
- Producer: George Martin

America chronology
Harbor (1977)	Live (1977)	Silent Letter (1979)

Professional ratings
Review scores
Source	Rating
AllMusic	3/5 stars
The Rolling Stone Album Guide	1.5/5 stars

America Live is the first official live album by American folk rock duo America, released in December of 1977 by Warner Bros. Records. The concert featured on the album was recorded on July 14, 1977, at the Greek Theatre in Griffith Park, Los Angeles, California. It was the first record to feature America as a duo, as Dan Peek had left the group to pursue a solo career just two months prior. The record was produced by George Martin, his sole live album credit alongside the six consecutive studio LPs he produced for America.

Commercially, the album performed poorly when compared with America's studio albums, peaking at No. 127 on the Billboard 200. No singles were released from the album.

== Track listing ==
No.	Title	Writer(s)	Length
1.	"Tin Man"	Dewey Bunnell	3:38
2.	"Muskrat Love"	Willis Alan Ramsey	3:07
3.	"I Need You"	Gerry Beckley	2:41
4.	"Old Man Took"	Bunnell	3:29
5.	"Daisy Jane"	Beckley	3:04
6.	"Company"	Bunnell	3:21
7.	"Hollywood"	Bunnell	3:51
8.	"Sergeant Darkness"	Beckley	2:56
9.	"Amber Cascades"	Bunnell	2:47
10.	"To Each His Own"	Beckley	3:16
11.	"Another Try"	Beckley	2:59
12.	"Ventura Highway"	Bunnell	3:28
13.	"Sister Golden Hair"	Beckley	3:26
14.	"A Horse with No Name"	Bunnell	4:18
