= The Grand Cayman Concert =

Live album by America
- Released: November 12, 2002
- Recorded: April 5, 2002
- Genre: Pop rock
- Length: 51:07
- Label: America

America chronology
Holiday Harmony (2002)	The Grand Cayman Concert (2002)	Here & Now (2007)

The Grand Cayman Concert is the fifth official live album by American folk rock duo America, released by the group in 2002. The concert consisted of Gerry Beckley and Dewey Bunnell performing a number of their hits in a stripped-down, acoustic manner not seen since the early days when America performed as an acoustic trio. The concert was performed in the Cayman Islands, the longtime home of former bandmate Dan Peek.

== Track listing ==
1. "Riverside" (Dewey Bunnell)
2. "Ventura Highway" (Bunnell)
3. "Daisy Jane" (Gerry Beckley)
4. "Windwave" (Bunnell)
5. "Another Try" (Beckley)
6. "Three Roses" (Bunnell)
7. "I Need You" (Beckley)
8. "Baby It's Up to You" (Beckley)
9. "Pigeon Song" (Bunnell)
10. "All My Life" (Beckley)
11. "Tin Man" (Bunnell)
12. "To Each His Own" (Beckley)
13. "Only in Your Heart" (Beckley)
14. "Sandman" (Bunnell)
15. "Sister Golden Hair" (Beckley)
16. "A Horse with No Name" (Bunnell)
