= Horse with No Name (album) =

Horse With No Name

Live album by America
- Released: 1995
- Recorded: West Germany, 1975
- Genre: Folk rock
- Label: MasterTone (Germany)

America chronology
In Concert (1995)	Horse With No Name (1995)	Human Nature (1998)

Horse With No Name is the fourth live album by American folk rock band America, released by MasterTone Records in Germany in 1995. The concert was recorded (without a live audience) for the German television program Musikladen in early 1975. This release was the first officially released live concert recording of America as a trio with Dan Peek. It included a standard audio CD along with a video CD of the same concert. This concert has also been aired on VH1 and on two separate DVD releases. Clips from the concert have also been shown on numerous television shows and commercials.

== Track listing ==
1. "Ventura Highway"
2. "I Need You"
3. "Don't Cross the River"
4. "A Horse with No Name"
5. "Moon Song"
6. "Lonely People"
7. "Wind Wave"
8. "Rainbow Song"
9. "Tin Man"
10. "California Revisited"
11. "Green Monkey"
