= California Dreamin' =

1965 single by the Mamas & the Papas

- US picture sleeve (restored)

Single by the Mamas & the Papas

from the album If You Can Believe Your Eyes and Ears
- B-side: "Somebody Groovy"
- Released: December 1965
- Recorded: November 1965
- Studio: United Western, Hollywood
- Genre: Sunshine pop; psychedelic pop; folk rock; soft rock
- Length: 2:42
- Label: Dunhill • RCA Victor
- Songwriters: John Phillips; Michelle Phillips
- Producer: Lou Adler

The Mamas & the Papas singles chronology
"Go Where You Wanna Go" (1965)	"California Dreamin'" (1965)	"Monday, Monday" (1966)

Audio
- "California Dreamin'" on YouTube

"California Dreamin'"
The Mamas & the Papas' "California Dreamin'" from their debut album, If You Can Believe Your Eyes and Ears.

"California Dreamin'" is a song written by John and Michelle Phillips. The best-known version is by the Mamas & the Papas, who released it as a single in December 1965.

"California Dreamin'" became a well-known example of the "California sound", and the 1960s counterculture era. It was certified three-times platinum by the Recording Industry Association of America in June 2023 and was inducted into the Grammy Hall of Fame in 2001. In 2021, Rolling Stone placed the song at number 420 in its "500 Greatest Songs of All Time" list. In June 2026, CBS News included the song in its list of the 250 essential American songs of the past 250 years.

== History ==
The song was written in 1963 while John Phillips and Michelle Phillips were living in New York City during a particularly cold winter, and the latter was missing sunny California. John would work on compositions late at night and brought Michelle the first verse one morning. At the time, John and Michelle Phillips were members of the folk group the New Journeymen, which evolved into the Mamas and the Papas.

They earned their first record contract after being introduced to Lou Adler, the head of Dunhill Records, by Barry McGuire. In thanks to Adler, they sang the backing vocals to "California Dreamin'" with members of the session band the Wrecking Crew, on McGuire's album This Precious Time. Adler, impressed with the Mamas and the Papas, then had the lead vocal track re-recorded with Denny Doherty singing, but paired with the same instrumental and backing vocal tracks, and an alto flute solo by Bud Shank, reportedly improvised. The guitar introduction was performed by P. F. Sloan. McGuire's original vocal can be briefly heard on the left channel at the beginning of the record, having not been completely erased.

The single was released in late 1965 but was not an immediate breakthrough. After gaining little attention in Los Angeles, a radio station in Boston was the catalyst to break the song nationwide. After making its chart debut in January 1966, the song peaked at No. 4 in March on both the Billboard Hot 100, lasting 17 weeks, and Cashbox, lasting 20 weeks. "California Dreamin'" was the top single on the Billboard end-of-the-year survey for 1966. As well, it tied for #1 on the Cashbox end-of-the-year survey with SSgt. Barry Sadler's "Ballad of the Green Berets".

"California Dreamin'" reached number 23 on the UK charts upon its original release, and re-charted after its use in a Carling Premier commercial in 1997, peaking at number nine.

Billboard described the song as having "a fascinating new sound with well written commercial material" and praised Lou Adler's production". Cash Box described it as a "medium-paced, rhythmic shufflin' romantic woeser [sic] with a plaintive, lyrical undercurrent".

The song is used repeatedly in the 1994 Hong Kong film Chungking Express as a central plot point and a cover by the Beach Boys was used on season 4 of Stranger Things.

Michelle Phillips wrote the lyrics "Well, I got down on my knees / And I pretend to pray", but Cass Elliot had sung "began" on the original recording and had continued doing so on tour until corrected by Phillips.

== Personnel ==
According to Dan Daley:

The Mamas & the Papas

- Denny Doherty – lead vocals and harmony vocals
- Cass Elliot – harmony vocals
- John Phillips – acoustic guitar and harmony vocals
- Michelle Phillips – harmony vocals

Additional musicians

- Bud Shank – flute solo
- The Wrecking Crew
  - Hal Blaine – drums and tambourine
  - Larry Knechtel – piano
  - Joe Osborn – bass
  - P.F. Sloan – acoustic guitar (only intro)

Production

- Lou Adler – producer
- Bones Howe – engineering

== Chart history ==
=== Weekly charts ===
Chart (1966)	Peak position
Australia (Kent Music Report)	87
Canada RPM Top Singles	3
New Zealand (Listener)	14
UK Singles (OCC)	23
US Billboard Hot 100	4
US Cash Box Top 100	4

Chart (1997)	Peak position
UK Singles (OCC)	9

=== Year-end charts ===
Chart (1966)	Rank
US Billboard Hot 100	1
US Cash Box	1

== Certifications ==
Region	Certification	Certified units/sales
Denmark (IFPI Danmark)	Platinum	90,000^{‡}
France (SNEP)	Gold	100,000^{‡}
Germany (BVMI)	Platinum	600,000^{‡}
Italy (FIMI)	Platinum	100,000^{‡}
New Zealand (RMNZ)	3× Platinum	90,000^{‡}
Spain (Promusicae)	Platinum	60,000^{‡}
United Kingdom (BPI)	3× Platinum	1,800,000^{‡}
United States (RIAA)	4× Platinum	4,000,000^{‡}
^{‡} Sales+streaming figures based on certification alone.

== Other versions ==
=== America version ===
"California Dreamin'"

Single by America

from the album California Dreaming soundtrack
- B-side: "See It My Way" (by F.D.R.)
- Released: March 1979
- Recorded: Studio 55 (Hollywood) 1978
- Genre: Soft rock
- Length: 2:44
- Label: American International
- Songwriters: John Phillips, Michelle Phillips
- Producers: Dewey Bunnell, Gerry Beckley

America singles chronology
"Don't Cry Baby" (1977)	"California Dreamin'" (1979)	"Only Game in Town" (1979)

In the spring of 1979, the band America reached No. 56 on the Billboard Hot 100 with its remake of "California Dreamin'" which was the first studio recording by America as the duo of Gerry Beckley and Dewey Bunnell, without third founding member Dan Peek, who had departed the group in 1977. Bunnell – who sang lead – and Beckley – who sang background – self-produced the track, which featured America's touring musicians: David Dickey, drummer Willie Leacox, guitarist Michael Woods, percussionist Tom Walsh, and Jim Calire who played keyboards and also saxophone.

America performed "California Dreamin'" at least once in concert in 1974, "California Dreamin'" being a sentimental favorite of the band's members having been a set list staple of the cover band in which all three had performed while London Central High School students in the late 1960s. The recording of "California Dreamin'" by America was specifically made to play under the closing credits of the American International Pictures (AIP) movie release California Dreaming, which had been shot in the final months of 1977 for release in the summer of 1978, although the movie was held back from wide release until March 16, 1979 with America recording the song "California Dreamin'" in the autumn of 1978: Beckley and Bunnell agreed to record the song after being (at least partially) shown the movie – (Gerry Beckley quote:) "We liked what we saw" – and the track was recorded at Studio 55 (Hollywood): (Gerry Beckley quote:) "We did it more as a rock thing [compared to the original], [with] a full sound but reliant on the harmonies."

The track was originally scheduled for a January 15, 1979, release which was delayed until after AIP's February 1979 pacting with Casablanca Records to distribute the California Dreaming soundtrack, Casablanca having recently managed to bolster the modest success of the film Thank God It's Friday through a hit soundtrack album: the recording of "California Dreamin'" by America was therefore given parallel release with the movie, another soundtrack item: "See It My Way" by session group F.D.R., serving as B-side. Both the America single and (in April 1978) the soundtrack album were issued by AIP on its own label (distributed by Casablanca): outside the US and Canada, Casablanca acted as label of release.

By the spring of 1979, America were involved in sessions for its Capitol Records debut album Silent Letter and were either unable or uninterested in promoting its version of "California Dreamin'," which single proved unable to buoy its parent film's faltering box office take. However, the publicity inherent in the film's release was evidently enough to afford minor hit status for America's soundtrack item (heard in the film's trailer, America's "California Dreamin'" was also cited in the movie's poster), and despite its lowly chart peak, America's "California Dreamin'" remake was more successful than any of its first five Capitol single releases, none of which ranked in the Hot 100 (the band's sixth Capitol single release, "You Can Do Magic" in 1982 afforded the band a sole latter-day top ten hit).

"California Dreamin'" continued to be featured in America's live gigs, eventually being established as a mandatory America concert title. A live performance of the song by America is featured on In Concert, the band's 1996 album release of a 1982 live gig. The band's 1978 recording was included on the 2000 America retrospective boxed set Highway: 30 Years of America as well as on The Complete Greatest Hits in 2001.

=== Beach Boys version ===
"California Dreamin'"

Single by the Beach Boys

from the album Made in U.S.A.
- B-side: "Lady Liberty"
- Released: September 1986
- Recorded: May 1986
- Genre: Rock
- Length: 3:10
- Label: Capitol
- Songwriters: John Phillips; Michelle Phillips
- Producer: Terry Melcher

The Beach Boys singles chronology
"Rock 'n' Roll to the Rescue" (1986)	"California Dreamin'" (1986)	"Happy Endings" (1987)

Music video
- "California Dreamin'" on YouTube

==== Background ====
The Beach Boys recorded "California Dreamin'" in 1986 for their greatest hits compilation Made in U.S.A. It was produced by Terry Melcher and featured Roger McGuinn of the Byrds on 12-string guitar. This version of the song was referenced in the lyrics of the Dead Milkmen's 1988 novelty hit "Punk Rock Girl".

Although the song only charted at a modest No. 57 on the Billboard Hot 100, it reached No. 8 on the Billboard Adult Contemporary chart and it was supported by a music video that saw heavy rotation on MTV. The video featured the Beach Boys along with John Phillips, Michelle Phillips and Roger McGuinn. Denny Doherty was on the East coast and declined; Cass Elliot had died in 1974.

==== Personnel ====
Credits sourced from Craig Slowinski and Andrew G. Doe.

The Beach Boys

- Al Jardine – lead vocals and backing vocals
- Carl Wilson – lead vocals and backing vocals, acoustic guitar
- Brian Wilson – synthesizer and backing vocals
- Mike Love – backing vocals
- Bruce Johnston – bass and backing vocals

Additional musicians and production staff

- Roger McGuinn – 12-string electric guitar
- Joel Peskin – saxophone
- Jeff Foskett – backing vocals
- Adrian Baker – backing vocals
- Mike Kowalski – drums

=== Jose Feliciano version ===
Released as a single on RCA Records in the summer of 1968, José Feliciano's arrangement reached number 43 on the Billboard Hot 100 chart and number 20 on the Billboard Rhythm & Blues Singles chart. The song was the A-side of a single that became a big hit when radio stations started to play the B-side with his cover of "Light My Fire", which reached number 3 on the Billboard Hot 100 and was popular in many other countries around the world. This elaborate string version with jazz Latin influences serves as the opening track of Feliciano's 1968 hit album Feliciano! (Gold status in 1968), and was heard in a key sequence in Quentin Tarantino's 2019 film Once Upon a Time in Hollywood, and is included on its soundtrack.

==== Personnel ====
Credits sourced from album liner notes.

- José Feliciano – vocals, guitar
- Ray Brown – bass
- Jim Horn – flute, alto flute
- Milt Holland – percussion
- Bruce Johnston – vocals

Additional musicians and production staff

- George Tipton – orchestral arrangements
- Rick Jarrard – producer

=== River City People version ===
In 1990, English folk rock quartet River City People released a version of "California Dreamin'" as a double A-side single with the song "Carry the Blame". This single reached number 13 in the UK singles chart.

=== Freischwimmer version ===
A tropical house version by German DJ/remixer Freischwimmer was released in 2015. This version reached number one on the Billboard Dance Club Songs chart in its February 13, 2016, issue. "Dreamin'" had never before hit No. 1 on any ranking, making this version the first in its nearly 50-year history to reach the top spot on a Billboard chart.

== See also ==
- List of Billboard number-one dance songs of 2016
