= Human Nature (America album) =

Studio album by America
- Released: September 1998
- Recorded: 1998
- Studios: Human Nature Studios, Sherman Oaks, California
- Genre: Folk rock
- Length: 49:34
- Label: Oxygen
- Producers: Gerry Beckley, Dewey Bunnell

America chronology
| Horse with No Name (1995) | Human Nature (1998) | Highway (2000) |

Human Nature is the 14th studio album by American folk rock duo America, released in 1998 by Oxygen Records. It was their first new studio album since 1994's Hourglass.

"From a Moving Train" was released as the first single from the album, becoming a minor hit in the US, reaching #25 on the Radio & Records Adult Contemporary chart and did better in Europe, reaching #1 in Spain. "Wednesday Morning" and "Moment to Moment" were released as follow-up singles in Europe. "Wheels Are Turning" also received some radio airplay in the US.

Carl Wilson (of the Beach Boys) and Robert Lamm (of Chicago) appear on "Hidden Talent". Wilson succumbed to cancer in February 1998 before this album's release.

== Track listing ==
| No. | Title | Writer(s) | Length |
|---|---|---|---|
| 1. | "From a Moving Train" | Gerry Beckley | 3:42 |
| 2. | "Wednesday Morning" | Beckley | 3:45 |
| 3. | "Town and Country" | Dewey Bunnell, Beckley | 3:02 |
| 4. | "Moment to Moment" | Beckley, Phil Galdston | 4:57 |
| 5. | "Hidden Talent" | Beckley | 3:55 |
| 6. | "Wheels Are Turning" | Bunnell, Beckley | 4:34 |
| 7. | "World Alone" | Bunnell | 3:31 |
| 8. | "Overwhelming World Suite: Overwhelming World/Come Back/Barstow" | Beckley | 7:51 |
| 9. | "Pages" | Bunnell, Beckley | 3:52 |
| 10. | "Hot Town" | Bunnell | 3:43 |
| 11. | "Whispering" | Beckley | 3:27 |
| 12. | "Oloololo" | Bunnell, Beckley | 3:08 |

== Reception ==
Professional ratings
Review scores
| Source | Rating |
|---|---|
| Allmusic | 2/5 stars |
| The Rolling Stone Album Guide | 1/5 stars |

Allmusic gave a positive review of the album, stating "... the songs are uniformly well-crafted and hook-laden, in particular the highly atmospheric "From a Moving Train," and the jangly "Wednesday Morning." Nevertheless, the album was rated only two stars out of five.
