= American Records =

American Records, America Records or American record may refer to:

- America Records (France), French jazz label
- American Record Company (1904–06), an American record label from 1904 to 1906
- American Record Corporation, or ARC (from 1929)
- American Recordings (record label), formerly known as Def American Recordings
- America discography, of the band named America
