= Lost & Found (America album) =

Studio album by America
- Released: May 5, 2015
- Recorded: 2000–2011
- Genre: Soft rock
- Length: 39:33
- Label: America
- Producers: Gerry Beckley, Dewey Bunnell, Bobby Woods

America chronology
Back Pages (2011)	Lost & Found (2015)	Archives, Vol. 1 (2015)

Lost & Found is a studio album by America, released in 2015. It includes songs from their archive that were not released previously, which the band rediscovered and polished. Notable tracks include the up-tempo song "Driving", which became their opener while on tour.

== Track listing ==
No.	Title	Writer(s)	Length
1.	"Driving"	Gerry Beckley	3:42
2.	"All in All"	Beckley, Dewey Bunnell	4:17
3.	"One Horse Town"	Beckley	4:27
4.	"The Quiet Inside"	Beckley, Bunnell	3:22
5.	"Many Colors"	Beckley	3:23
6.	"Dream Come True"	Bunnell	4:17
7.	"Don't Let Her Close Your Eyes"	Beckley	4:46
8.	"Out on the Street"	Beckley, Bunnell	2:58
9.	"Green"	Beckley	4:43
10.	"Early Days"	Beckley, Bunnell	3:38

== Personnel ==
America

- Gerry Beckley – lead and harmony vocals, acoustic and electric guitar, bass, mandolin, piano, organ, keyboards, drums
- Dewey Bunnell – lead and harmony vocals, acoustic and electric guitars

with:

- Hank Linderman – electric guitar
- Dave Storrs – electric guitar
- Larry Treadwell – electric guitar
- Jason Scheff – bass
- Bob DiChiro – bass
- Ryland Steen – drums
- Brian Young – drums
- Jim McCarty – drums
- Andrew Golomb – drums
- Bobby Woods – organ, backing vocals
- Nick Lane – trombone, euphonium
- Charles Adelphia – oboe

Production

- Gerry Beckley – tracks 1,3,5,7,9
- Gerry Beckley with Dewey Bunnell – tracks 2,4,8,10
- Dewey Bunnell and Bobby Woods – track 6
- Jeff Larson – executive producer, compiled and archived
