= Silent Letter =

Studio album by America
- Released: June 15, 1979
- Recorded: March–April 1979
- Studios: AIR, Montserrat
- Genre: Pop rock
- Length: 34:50
- Label: Capitol
- Producer: George Martin

America chronology
America Live (1977)	Silent Letter (1979)	Alibi (1980)

Singles from Silent Letters
- 1. "Only Game in Town" Released: August 1979; 2. "All My Life" Released: October 1979; 3. "All Around" Released: January 1980

Professional ratings
Review scores
Source	Rating
AllMusic	3/5 stars
MusicHound Rock: The Essential Album Guide	1.5/5 stars
(The New) Rolling Stone Album Guide	1/5 stars

Silent Letter is the eighth studio album by American folk rock duo America, released by Capitol Records in June 1979.

It was the first America studio album following the departure of Dan Peek. It was also the first America release on Capitol Records and the last of six consecutive America studio albums which George Martin produced.

It was also their first studio album since their debut to have a title beginning with a letter other than "H". The title itself acknowledges the missing "H" by its wry reference to silent letters in the English language. "H" is the eighth letter in the alphabet, matching the fact that this is their eighth album.

The album contains fast-paced disco songs, piano-based power ballads (often sung by Gerry Beckley) and mid-tempo pop rock songs.

== Reception ==
In his AllMusic retrospective review, music critic Steven Thomas Erlewine noted the band's transition from "folky California soft rock" to adult contemporary. He wrote of the album: "The end result may be flawed, but in an enjoyable way. And compared to the records that preceded it and some of albums that followed it, Silent Letter certainly seems like a latter-day highlight for America."

The album was not a commercial success, reaching only number 110 on the Billboard album chart. However, it did produce three minor hit singles. "Only Game in Town" bubbled under the Hot 100 chart, peaking at number 107. "All My Life" and "All Around" narrowly missed the Top 40 on the Adult Contemporary chart, peaking at number 48 and 45 respectively. The former was a big hit in Asia.

== Track listing ==
No.	Title	Writer(s)	Length
1.	"Only Game in Town"	Lewis Anderson, Julie Didier, Casey Kelly	4:12
2.	"All Around"	Gerry Beckley, Dewey Bunnell	3:21
3.	"Tall Treasures"	Beckley, Bunnell	3:15
4.	"1960"	Beckley	3:10
5.	"And Forever"	Bunnell	3:11
6.	"Foolin'"	Beckley, Ricky Fataar	2:53
7.	"All Night"	Bunnell	3:19
8.	"No Fortune"	Beckley	3:18
9.	"All My Life"	Beckley	3:02
10.	"One Morning"	Bunnell	2:12
11.	"High in the City"	Beckley, Bunnell	3:02

== Personnel ==
America

- Gerry Beckley – vocals, guitars, keyboards
- Dewey Bunnell – vocals, guitars

with:

- Mike Woods – lead guitar
- David Dickey – bass
- Willie Leacox – drums
- Jim Calire – keyboards, saxophone solo
- Tom Walsh – percussion

== Charts ==
Chart (1979)	Peak position
Australian Albums (Kent Music Report)	51
Canada Top Albums/CDs (RPM)	80
US Billboard 200	110
