= Harbor (America album) =

Studio album by America
- Released: March 1977
- Recorded: 1976
- Studios: Ka Lae Kiki, Kauai, Hawaii
- Genres: Folk rock; pop rock
- Length: 33:20
- Label: Warner Bros.
- Producer: George Martin

America chronology
Hideaway (1976)	Harbor (1977)	America Live (1977)

Singles from Harbor
- 1. "God of the Sun" Released: February 1977; 2. "Slow Down" Released: April 1977; 3. "Don't Cry Baby" Released: June 1977

Professional ratings
Review scores
Source	Rating
AllMusic	2/5 stars
The Rolling Stone Album Guide	1/5 stars

Harbor is the seventh studio album by American folk rock trio America, released by Warner Bros. Records in February 1977. It was the last to feature Dan Peek, who embarked on a solo Christian career shortly after the album's release. The album was produced by George Martin, the fifth of six consecutive studio albums he produced for America.

Though a major commercial disappointment compared to America's six previous albums, the album did reach number 21 on the Billboard album chart. Three singles ("God of the Sun", "Don't Cry Baby" and the disco song "Slow Down") were released from the album but all failed to chart, although "God of the Sun" and "Now She's Gone" did receive some airplay.

Despite the serene tone of the title and artwork, Harbor is more brooding and pessimistic than most of America's previous albums.

== Track listing ==
=== Side one ===
No.	Title	Writer(s)	Length
1.	"God of the Sun"	Gerry Beckley	3:11
2.	"Slow Down"	Dan Peek	3:11
3.	"Don't Cry Baby"	Peek	3:18
4.	"Now She's Gone"	Beckley	2:25
5.	"Political Poachers"	Dewey Bunnell	2:39
6.	"Sarah"	Beckley	2:42

=== Side two ===
No.	Title	Writer(s)	Length
1.	"Sergeant Darkness"	Beckley	2:54
2.	"Are You There"	Bunnell	2:51
3.	"These Brown Eyes"	Peek	2:32
4.	"Monster"	Beckley	2:00
5.	"Hurricane"	Peek	2:29
6.	"Down to the Water"	Bunnell	2:35

== Personnel ==
America

- Dewey Bunnell – lead and backing vocals, guitars
- Gerry Beckley – lead and backing vocals, guitars, pianos, synthesizers
- Dan Peek – lead and backing vocals, guitars, pianos, synthesizers

with:

- David Dickey – bass guitar
- Willie Leacox – drums, percussion
- Jim Calire – saxophone
- Tom Walsh – percussion
- Larry Carlton – electric sitar

Technical

- George Martin – producer
- Henry Diltz – photographer
- Philip Hartmann – cover design
- Vivien Bunnell, Lexie Hartmann and Jim Hoskins – additional poster photography

== Charts ==
=== Weekly charts ===
Chart (1977)	Peak position
Australian Albums (Kent Music Report)	19
Canada Top Albums/CDs (RPM)	16
New Zealand Albums (RMNZ)	31
Norwegian Albums (VG-lista)	13
Swedish Albums (Sverigetopplistan)	33
US Billboard 200	21

=== Year-end charts ===
Chart (1977)	Position
Canada Top Albums/CDs (RPM)	91
