= Hideaway (America album) =

- Henry Diltz took the photograph of America at one of the guest houses at Caribou Ranch (now closed since a fire in 1984) in Nederland, Colorado

Studio album by America
- Released: 9 April 1976
- Recorded: February 16–28, 1976
- Studios: Caribou Ranch, Nederland, Colorado
- Genres: Folk rock; pop rock
- Length: 39:59
- Label: Warner Bros.
- Producer: George Martin

America chronology
History: America's Greatest Hits (1975)	Hideaway (1976)	Harbor (1977)

Singles from Hideaway
- 1. "Today's the Day" Released: April 1976; 2. "Amber Cascades" Released: August 1976; 3. "She's a Liar" Released: November 1976

Professional ratings
Review scores
Source	Rating
AllMusic	3/5 stars
The Rolling Stone Album Guide	2/5 stars

Hideaway is the sixth studio album by American folk rock trio America, released by Warner Bros. Records in April 1976. The album was produced by George Martin, the fourth of six consecutive studio albums he produced for America.

It was recorded at Caribou Ranch in Colorado in February 1976, with the album cover and inner sleeve photos reflecting the wintry environment. Deciding that they needed a contrast, the group recorded its next album Harbor in Hawaii.

This album was a hit in the US, peaking at number 11 on the Billboard album chart and being certified Gold by the RIAA. It produced two hit singles: "Today's the Day", which reached 23 on the Billboard singles chart and went all the way to number 1 on the adult contemporary chart for two weeks; and "Amber Cascades", which peaked at 75 on the Billboard singles chart and hit number 17 on the Adult Contemporary chart. Several other songs received airplay on FM stations playing album tracks, including "Jet Boy Blue", "Watership Down", "Don't Let It Get You Down", and "Lovely Night".

== Track listing ==
No.	Title	Writer(s)	Length
1.	"Lovely Night"	Gerry Beckley	2:32
2.	"Amber Cascades"	Dewey Bunnell	2:50
3.	"Don't Let It Get You Down"	Bunnell	2:58
4.	"Can't You See"	Dan Peek	2:22
5.	"Watership Down"	Beckley	4:58
6.	"She's Beside You"	D. Peek	2:58
7.	"Hideaway Part I"	Bunnell	1:30
8.	"She's a Liar"	Beckley	3:28
9.	"Letter"	Bunnell	3:05
10.	"Today's the Day"	D. Peek	3:15
11.	"Jet Boy Blue"	D. Peek, Catherine Peek	3:21
12.	"Who Loves You"	Beckley	4:33
13.	"Hideaway Part II"	Bunnell	2:03

== Personnel ==
America

- Dewey Bunnell – guitar, lead and backing vocals
- Gerry Beckley – guitar, lead and backing vocals, keyboard
- Dan Peek – guitar, banjo, lead and backing vocals, keyboard

with:

- David Dickey – bass guitar
- Willie Leacox – drums, percussion
- George Martin – piano on "She's Beside You" and "Hideaway Part I"

== Charts ==
=== Weekly charts ===
Chart (1976)	Peak position
Australian Albums (Kent Music Report)	12
Canada Top Albums/CDs (RPM)	10
Japanese Albums (Oricon)	62
New Zealand Albums (RMNZ)	12
Swedish Albums (Sverigetopplistan)	48
US Billboard 200	11

=== Year-end charts ===
Chart (1976)	Position
Canada Top Albums/CDs (RPM)	75

== Certifications ==
Region	Certification	Certified units/sales
United States (RIAA)	Gold	500,000^{^}
^{^} Shipments figures based on certification alone.
