= I Need You (America song) =

Single by America

from the album America
- B-side: "Riverside"
- Released: April 26, 1972
- Recorded: 1971
- Genre: Soft rock
- Length: 3:04
- Label: Warner Bros.
- Songwriter: Gerry Beckley
- Producers: Ian Samwell; Jeff Dexter; America

America singles chronology
"A Horse with No Name" (1972)	"I Need You" (1972)	"Ventura Highway" (1972)

Licensed audio
- "I Need You" on YouTube

"I Need You" is the second single by the band America from their eponymous debut album America, released in 1972. The song was written by Gerry Beckley.

Cash Box described it as "a gentle, 'Something'-ish ballad."

It appears on the live albums Live (1977), In Concert (1985), In Concert (King Biscuit), Horse with No Name – Live! (1995), and The Grand Cayman Concert (2002). The studio version is included on the compilation albums Highway (2000) and The Complete Greatest Hits (2001).

George Martin remixed the studio recording for inclusion on History: America's Greatest Hits (1975) with the pitch brought down a quarter tone and the bass guitar brought up further in volume from the original release. An alternate mix from 1971 (otherwise based on the George Martin mix) appears on the 2015 release Archives, Vol. 1.

== Personnel ==
(Per back cover of 1972 vinyl issue of America.)

- Dewey Bunnell – 6-string acoustic guitar, backing vocals
- Gerry Beckley – lead vocals, bass, piano
- Dan Peek – 12-string electric guitar, backing vocals
- Dave Atwood – drums

== Charts ==
The song was a top ten hit and spent 10 weeks in United States Billboard Hot 100 charts wherein it peaked at number 9. It was the band's second top ten single, following the success of their previous hit "A Horse with No Name". It also charted in the Billboard Adult Contemporary Chart at number 7, and both Cash Box Singles Chart and Record World Singles Chart at number 8. Unlike their previous hit single, it didn't receive any certifications by RIAA.

=== Weekly charts ===
Chart (1972)	Peak position
Canada RPM Top Singles	5
New Zealand (Listener)	18
US Billboard Hot 100	9
US Easy Listening (Billboard)	7
US Cash Box Top 100	8
US Record World	8

=== Year-end charts ===
Chart (1972)	Position
Canada (RPM)	67

== Cover versions ==
Andy Williams released a version in 1972 on his album, Alone Again (Naturally). In the same year Percy Faith and Ray Conniff also released versions of the song.

Harry Nilsson recorded the song for his 1976 album ...That's the Way It Is.

== See also ==
- List of Billboard Hot 100 top-ten singles in 1972
