= Don't Cross the River =

- German single cover, photo is also used on the parent album front cover.

Single by America

from the album Homecoming
- B-side: "To Each His Own"
- Released: January 1973
- Studio: The Record Plant, Los Angeles
- Genre: Country
- Length: 2:30
- Label: Warner Bros.
- Songwriter: Dan Peek
- Producer: America

America singles chronology
"Ventura Highway" (1972)	"Don't Cross the River" (1973)	"Only in Your Heart" (1973)

"Don't Cross the River" is a song written by Dan Peek of the American rock band America, released as the second of three singles from their 1972 album Homecoming.

== Release and reception ==
Record World stated that it is a "more countrified cut complete with banjos and all", ending that they believed it would be as successful as "Ventura Highway". Cashbox magazine stated that following "In the footsteps of 'Ventura Highway'" is a "relatively easy task for America when you consider that each and every one of their singles is stronger than the last", ending that "This one looks and feels just right".

The song has been included on compilations such as History: America's Greatest Hits, The Definitive America and The Complete Greatest Hits.

== Track listing ==
1. "Don't Cross the River" – 2:30
2. "To Each His Own" – 3:13

== Personnel ==
=== Original version ===
Adapted from the digital liner notes:

America

- Dan Peek – guitar, vocals, songwriting
- Gerry Beckley – keyboards, vocals
- Dewey Bunnell – guitar, vocals,

Additional musicians

- Joe Osborn – bass guitar
- Hal Blaine – drums, percussion
- Henry Diltz – banjo (not on the original recording, Martin’s remix adds the banjo.)

Technical

- Chuck Leary – assistant engineer
- Bill Halverson – engineer
- Mike Stone – engineer
- George Martin – mixing engineer

=== 2007 re-recording ===
Adapted from the digital liner notes:

America

- Gerry Beckley – vocals, guitar
- Dewey Bunnell – vocals, guitar
- Rich Campbell – vocals, bass guitar
- Willie Leacox – drums
- Michael Woods – vocals, piano
- Dan Peek – songwriter

Technical

- George Marino – mastering engineer
- Michael Taylor – engineer
- Jeff Worrell – engineer
- John Holbrook – mixing engineer

== Charts ==
Chart (1973)	Peak position
Australia (Kent Music Report)	94
Canada Top Singles (RPM)	49
Canada Adult Contemporary (RPM)	21
US Billboard Hot 100	35
US Adult Contemporary (Billboard)	23
