= Doer of the Word =

Studio album by Dan Peek
- Released: 1984
- Genre: Contemporary Christian music, soft rock
- Label: Home Sweet Home
- Producer: Chris Christian

Dan Peek chronology
All Things Are Possible (1979)	Doer of the Word (1984)	Electro-Voice (1986)

Doer of the Word is the second solo album by former America member Dan Peek. It was released in 1984, five years after the release of his first album, All Things Are Possible, and produced by Chris Christian.

Several songs from the album received airplay on contemporary Christian music radio. The title track hit number 2 on the Christian charts. Peek's former America bandmate, Gerry Beckley contributed background vocals on the song, which were recorded at Chris Christian's studio in Los Angeles while Peek was there. "Redeemer" and "Holy Spirit" also charted.

== Track listing ==
1. "Doer of the Word" (Jeremy Dalton)
2. "Holy Spirit" (Dan Peek)
3. "Reach Out" (Peek)
4. "Everything" (Peek, Chris Christian, Phil Naish)
5. "Your Father Loves You" (Christian)
6. "Brotherly Love" (Peek, Christian, Naish)
7. "Redeemer" (Peek)
8. "I Believe in Miracles" (Dan & Catherine Peek)
9. "Thank You Lord" (Peek)
10. "Power and Glory" (Tom Peek)
11. "The Star" (Peek) (bonus track on the 2021 remaster release)
12. "One Way" (extended version) (Christian) (bonus track on the 2021 remaster release)
