= America (America album) =

Studio album by America
- Released: January 1972
- Recorded: 1971
- Studios: Trident, London; Morgan, London
- Genres: Folk rock; folk-pop
- Length: 46:14
- Label: Warner Bros.
- Producers: Ian Samwell; Jeff Dexter

America chronology
America (1972)	Homecoming (1972)

Singles from America
- 1. "A Horse with No Name" Released: 12 November 1971 (UK) (standalone, added in re-release); 2. "I Need You" Released: 26 April 1972 (US)

America is the debut studio album by the rock band America, released in January 1972. It was initially released without "A Horse with No Name", which was first released as a single in Europe in late 1971. When "A Horse with No Name" became a worldwide hit in January of 1972, the album was re-released with the track that same month.

The album went to the top of Billboard's album chart in the United States and stayed there for five weeks. It produced two hit singles; "A Horse with No Name", which spent three weeks on top of the Billboard singles chart in 1972, and "I Need You", which hit the ninth position on the Billboard singles chart. Several other songs received radio airplay on FM stations, including "Sandman" and "Three Roses". The album was certified platinum by the RIAA for sales in excess of one million units in the United States.

The album cover art features band members Dewey Bunnell, Gerry Beckley, and Dan Peek sitting in front of an 1887 picture of Crow prisoners captured by the United States Army in Montana.

== Critical reception ==
Professional ratings
Review scores
Source	Rating
AllMusic	4/5 stars
The Rolling Stone Album Guide	2/5 stars

In his AllMusic review, music critic David Cleary called the band's debut album a "folk-pop classic" and concluded, "In spite of its flaws, this platter is very highly recommended."

== Track listing ==
Side one
No.	Title	Writer(s)	Length
1.	"Riverside"	Dewey Bunnell	3:03
2.	"Sandman"	Bunnell	5:08
3.	"Three Roses"	Bunnell	3:54
4.	"Children"	Bunnell	3:07
5.	"A Horse with No Name" (bonus track on 1972 reissue and included on all subsequent reissues)	Bunnell	4:10
6.	"Here"	Gerry Beckley	5:30

Side two
No.	Title	Writer(s)	Length
1.	"I Need You"	Beckley	3:05
2.	"Rainy Day"	Dan Peek	2:55
3.	"Never Found the Time"	Peek	3:50
4.	"Clarice"	Beckley	4:01
5.	"Donkey Jaw"	Peek	5:17
6.	"Pigeon Song"	Bunnell	2:18

== Personnel ==
Credits are per back cover of 1972 vinyl issue.

America

- Dewey Bunnell – lead and backing vocals, 6-string acoustic guitar (except on "Here" and "Never Found the Time")
- Gerry Beckley – bass (except on "Three Roses" and "A Horse with No Name"), 6 and 12-string acoustic guitars (except on "Sandman", "I Need You" and "Pigeon Song"), lead and backing vocals (except on "Pigeon Song"), electric guitar and chimes on "Clarice", piano on "I Need You" and "Clarice"
- Dan Peek – 6 and 12-string acoustic guitars (except on "A Horse with No Name", "I Need You", "Clarice" and "Pigeon Song"), lead and backing vocals (except on "Pigeon Song"), electric guitar (on "Sandman", "Donkey Jaw" and "I Need You"), piano on "Never Found the Time", bass on "A Horse with No Name" and "Three Roses"

with:

- Ray Cooper – percussion
- Dave Atwood – drums on "Sandman", "Here", "I Need You" and "Donkey Jaw"
- Kim Haworth – drums on "A Horse with No Name"
- David Lindley – electric guitar on "Children", steel guitar on "Rainy Day"

Technical

- Ian Samwell – producer
- Jeff Dexter – executive producer
- Ken Scott – engineering
- Nigel Waymouth – cover photos and design
- Flash Fox – logo and graphics

== Charts ==
=== Weekly charts ===
Chart (1971–1972)	Peak position
Australian Albums (Kent Music Report)	3
Canada Top Albums/CDs (RPM)	1
Japanese Albums (Oricon)	9
Norwegian Albums (VG-lista)	22
Spanish Albums (AFYVE)	6
UK Albums (Official Charts)	14
US Billboard 200	1

=== Year-end charts ===
Chart (1972)	Position
US Billboard 200	8

== Certifications ==
Region	Certification	Certified units/sales
Canada (Music Canada)	Platinum	100,000^{^}
New Zealand (RMNZ)	Platinum	15,000^{‡}
United Kingdom (BPI)	Gold	100,000^{^}
United States (RIAA)	Platinum	1,000,000^{^}
^{^} Shipments figures based on certification alone.^{‡} Sales+streaming figures based on certification alone.
