= The Border (America song) =

Single by America

from the album Your Move
- B-side: "Sometimes Lovers"
- Released: June 1983
- Genre: Pop rock
- Length: 3:37
- Label: Capitol Records 5236
- Songwriters: Russ Ballard, Dewey Bunnell
- Producer: Russ Ballard

America singles chronology
"Sometimes Lovers" (1983)	"The Border" (1983)	"Cast the Spirit" (1983)

"The Border" is a song written by Russ Ballard and Dewey Bunnell and performed by America. The song appears on their 1983 album, Your Move.

Released as a single in 1983, the song became the band's final top 40 hit, reaching No. 33 on the Billboard Hot 100. However, it fared much better on the Adult Contemporary chart, peaking at No. 4. The song reached No. 22 in the Netherlands.

== Charts ==
Chart (1983)	Peak position
US Billboard Easy Listening	4
US Billboard Hot 100	33
US Cashbox	34
US Radio & Records	27
Canada RPM Top Singles	39
Canada Adult Contemporary	1
