= Today's the Day (America song) =

Single by America

from the album Hideaway
- B-side: "Hideaway Part II"
- Released: April 28, 1976
- Genre: Folk rock
- Length: 3:15
- Label: Warner Bros. 8212
- Songwriter: Dan Peek
- Producer: George Martin

America singles chronology
"Woman Tonight" (1975)	"Today's the Day" (1976)	"Amber Cascades" (1976)

"Today's the Day" is a song by America on their 1976 album Hideaway. and written by group member Dan Peek.

== Background ==
According to Dan Peek, "Today's the Day" was the inspiration for the Rod Stewart hit "Tonight's the Night (Gonna Be Alright)" a US #1 single for eight weeks from November 1976 to January 1977 which also afforded Stewart an international smash hit. Peek would recall that one evening when he and his guest Rod Stewart were playing together in Peek's home recording studio, "I played 'Today's the Day', the song I had been working on. Rod said that he liked it and that it gave him an idea for a song. Of course after his recording of 'Tonight's the Night' came out I laughed when I remembered what he'd said. I'm sure I probably smacked my forehead and said, 'Why didn't I think of that?'"

== Reception ==
Cash Box said the song has "a nice melody that builds to a certain tension" and that "the harmonies here seem to melt into one voice."

== Chart history ==
"Today's the Day" was released as the album's lead single in April 1976 and it peaked at #23 on the Billboard Hot 100, making it the most successful single from the album. The final Top 40 hit for America as a trio, "Today's the Day" was also America's third and final #1 on the Billboard Easy Listening chart which it topped for two weeks. Internationally "Today's the Day" appeared on the charts in Canada (#16), Australia (#55), and France (#67).

Chart (1976)	Peak position
Canada RPM Top Singles	16
Canada RPM Adult Contemporary	5
US Billboard Hot 100	23
US Billboard Easy Listening	1
US Cash Box Singles Chart	24
US Record World Singles Chart	33
US Radio & Records Singles Chart	16

== See also ==
- List of number-one adult contemporary singles of 1976 (U.S.)
