= Amber Cascades =

Single by America

from the album Hideaway
- B-side: "Who Loves You"
- Released: July 14, 1976
- Genre: Pop rock
- Length: 2:50
- Label: Warner Bros.
- Songwriter(s): Dewey Bunnell
- Producer(s): George Martin

America singles chronology
"Today's the Day" (1976)	"Amber Cascades" (1976)	"She's a Liar" (1976)

"Amber Cascades" is a song written by Dewey Bunnell and performed by America. It reached number 17 on both the U.S. and the Canadian adult contemporary charts, number 75 on the Billboard Hot 100, and number 82 on the Canadian pop chart in 1976. It was featured on their 1976 album, Hideaway.

The song was produced and arranged by George Martin.

== Charts ==
Chart (1976)	Peak position
US Billboard Hot 100	75
US Billboard Easy Listening	17
US Cash Box Singles Chart	99
