= Daisy Jane =

1975 song by America

- Side A of the US single

Single by America

from the album Hearts
- B-side: "Tomorrow"
- Released: July 2, 1975
- Genre: Soft rock
- Length: 3:07
- Label: Warner Bros.
- Songwriter: Gerry Beckley
- Producer: George Martin

America singles chronology
"Sister Golden Hair" (1975)	"Daisy Jane" (1975)	"Woman Tonight" (1975)

"Daisy Jane" is a song written by Gerry Beckley of the band America, included on the band's 1975 album Hearts. Issued as that album's second single — following up the #1 hit "Sister Golden Hair" — "Daisy Jane" reached #20 on the Billboard Hot 100, becoming the final Top 20 hit by the original three-member incarnation of America. On the Easy Listening chart the track reached #4. In Canada, the chart peak of "Daisy Jane" was #16 on the Pop singles chart and #2 on the Adult Contemporary chart.

The song's narrator indicates he's flying back to Memphis in hopes of reconnecting with the girl he left behind "to roam the city". Beckley, who wrote the song at his cottage in East Sussex, has stated: "There was no such person as Daisy Jane and I had never even been to Memphis": Beckley believes that he likely drew the idea of writing a song entitled "Daisy Jane" from the Nick Drake song "Hazey Jane".

Cash Box called it "a tender rock ballad with George Martin’s brilliant piano and string work in abundant evidence." Record World said that "the trio has never been hotter – nor smoother, for that matter."

The song features a solo cello.

Producer George Martin played the piano on the song.

A Finnish rendering which retains the title "Daisy Jane" was recorded by Reijo Karvonen for his 1975 album Tulossa.

The Janet Jackson track "Let's Wait Awhile" from her 1986 album Control has been described as "bear[ing] striking similarities" to "Daisy Jane". Reportedly on hearing "Let's Wait Awhile" on a car radio in 1987 - the track then being a current single - the road manager for the group America pulled over at a phone booth to alert Gerry Beckley to the evident debt of Jackson's track to Beckley's composition: eventually Beckley reached an out-of-court settlement with Jackson and her co-writers Jimmy Jam and Terry Lewis thus preempting litigation for plagiarism. (The 2001 Janet Jackson album All for You featured the track "Someone to Call My Lover" which overtly sampled the America hit "Ventura Highway" whose composer Dewey Bunnell received a co-write credit for Jackson's song.)

== Charts ==
=== Weekly charts ===
Chart (1975)	Peak position
Canada Top Singles (RPM)	16
Canada Adult Contemporary (RPM)	2
US Billboard Hot 100	20
US Adult Contemporary (Billboard)	4
US Cash Box Top 100	27
US Radio & Records	16
US Record World	23

=== Year-end charts ===
Chart (1975)	Rank
Canada	140
