= A Horse with No Name =

1971 single by America

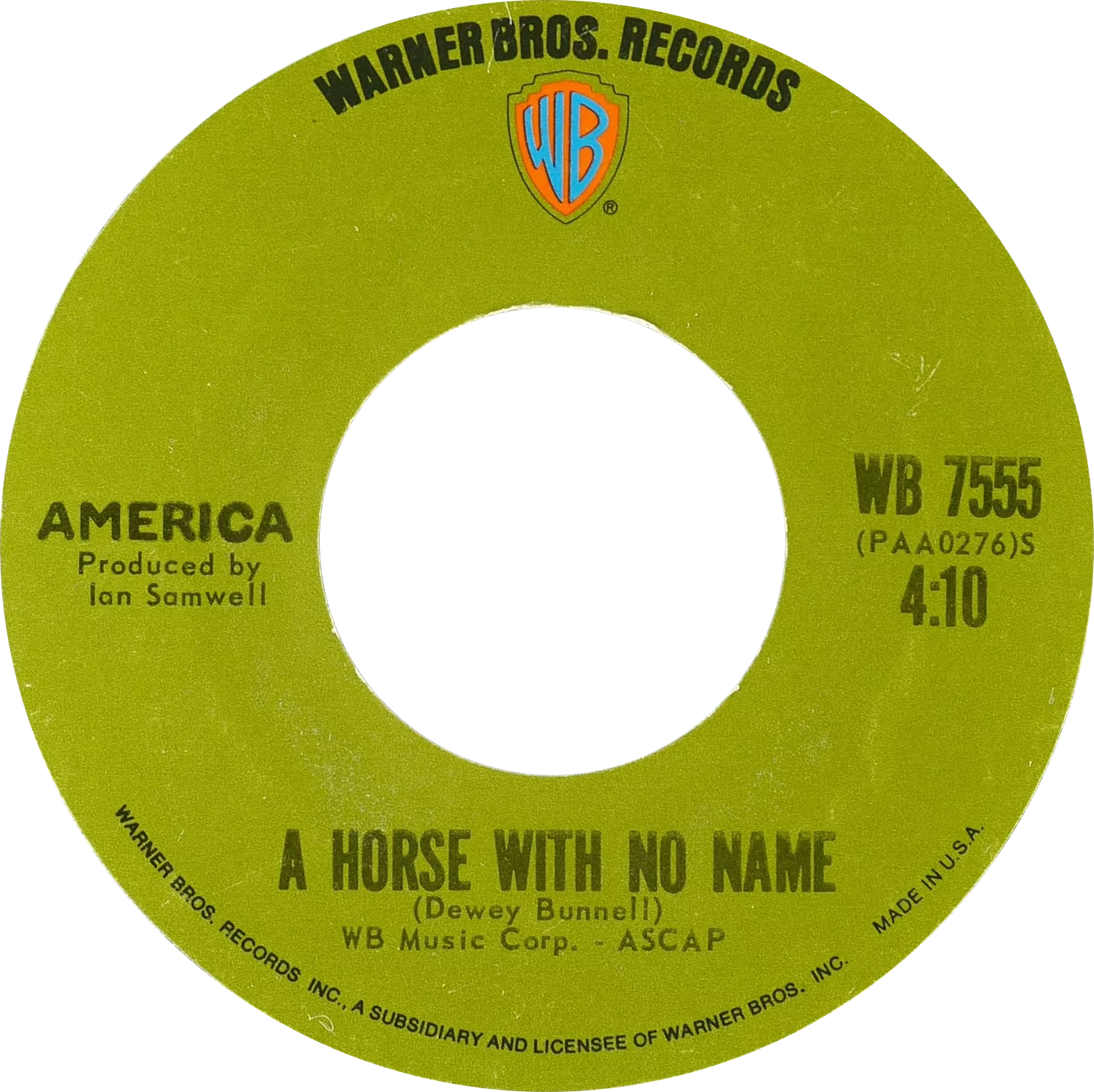
- Side A of the US single

Single by America

from the album America
- B-side: "Everyone I Meet Is from California"; "Sandman"
- Released: November 12, 1971 (UK)
- Recorded: 1971
- Studio: Morgan (Willesden, London)
- Genre: Folk rock; soft rock; rock
- Length: 4:08
- Label: Warner Bros.
- Songwriter: Dewey Bunnell
- Producer: Ian Samwell

America singles chronology
"A Horse with No Name" (1971)	"I Need You" (1972)

Audio sample
- file; help

Licensed audio
- "A Horse with No Name" on YouTube

"A Horse with No Name" is a song by British-American folk rock trio America. Written by Dewey Bunnell, it was released on the Warner Bros. label in late 1971 in Europe and early 1972 in the United States. The song met with commercial success and topped charts in Canada, Finland, and on the US Billboard Hot 100. It reached number 3 in the UK singles chart. It was certified gold by the Recording Industry Association of America (RIAA) on March 24, 1972.

Originally a standalone single, the song was re-released as the lead single of the band's debut studio album, America (which was released in January 1972). The song is a staple of the band's discography and one of their most popular.

== Development ==
America's self-titled debut album was released initially in Europe, without "A Horse with No Name", and achieved only moderate success. Originally called "Desert Song", "Horse" was written while the band was staying at the home of musician Arthur Brown, near Puddletown, Dorset, England. The first two demos were recorded there by Jeff Dexter and Dennis Elliott, which were intended to capture the sensation of the hot, dry desert that had been depicted in a Salvador Dalí painting, and in a picture by M. C. Escher which featured a horse. Writer Dewey Bunnell also says he remembered his childhood travels through the Arizona and New Mexico desert when his family lived at Vandenberg Air Force Base. The lyrics include the lines "I've been to the desert on a horse with no name. It felt good to be out of the rain." Bunnell has explained that "A Horse with No Name" was "a metaphor for a vehicle to get away from life's confusion into a quiet, peaceful place".

Trying to find a song that would be popular in both the United States and Europe, Warner Bros. was reluctant to release the ballad "I Need You" as the first single from America. The label asked the band if it had any other material, then arranged for America to record four more songs at Morgan Studios, in Willesden, London. "A Horse with No Name" was released as the featured song on a three-track single in the United Kingdom, Ireland, France, Italy and the Netherlands in late 1971. On the release, "A Horse with No Name" shared the A-side with "Everyone I Meet Is from California", while "Sandman" featured on the B-side. However, its early-1972 two-track United States release did not include "Sandman", with "Everyone I Meet Is from California" appearing on the B-side.

== Critical reception ==
The song was banned by some US radio stations, most notably WHB in Kansas City, because of supposed drug references to heroin use. ("Horse" is a common slang term for heroin.) Yet the song ascended to number one on the US Billboard Hot 100, and the album quickly reached platinum status. The song charted earlier on the Irish Singles Chart (reaching number 4), the Netherlands (reaching number 11) and on the UK singles chart (reaching number 3, the band's only Top 40 hit in the country) than it did in the United States.

The song's resemblance to some of Neil Young's work aroused some controversy. For example, in its review of "A Horse with No Name" Cashbox described America as "CSN&Y soundalikes." "I know that virtually everyone, on first hearing, assumed it was Neil", Bunnell said. "I never fully shied away from the fact that I was inspired by him. I think it's in the structure of the song as much as in the tone of his voice. It did hurt a little, because we got some pretty bad backlash. I've always attributed it more to people protecting their own heroes more than attacking me." By coincidence, it was "A Horse with No Name" that replaced Young's "Heart of Gold" at the number 1 spot on the US pop chart.

The single achieved sales of over 50,000 copies in Australia, being eligible for the award of a gold disc.

The song has received criticism for its lyrics, including "The heat was hot"; "There were plants, and birds, and rocks, and things"; and "'Cause there ain't no one for to give you no pain." According to an anecdote from Robert Christgau, Randy Newman dismissed "A Horse with No Name" as a "song about a kid who thinks he's taken acid".

Penn Jillette asked the band about their lyrics, "there were plants, and birds, and rocks, and things" after a show in Atlantic City, where America opened for Penn & Teller. According to Jillette, their explanation for the lyrics was that they were intoxicated with cannabis while writing it. In a 2012 interview, Beckley disputed Jillette's story, saying, "I don't think Dew was stoned."

== Personnel ==
Credits adapted per back cover of a 1972 vinyl issue of America.

America

- Dewey Bunnell – lead vocals, acoustic guitar
- Gerry Beckley – twelve-string acoustic guitars, backing vocals
- Dan Peek – bass guitar, backing vocals

Additional musicians

- Ray Cooper – percussion
- Kim Haworth – drums

== Popular culture ==
=== Cover versions ===
In 1972, Swedish band Family Four released "En Häst Utan Namn" on their album Picknick.

The Danish rock band D-A-D covered "A Horse with No Name" on their second studio album D.A.D. Draws a Circle (1987). It is their first and only cover version.

In 2025, English pop singer Limahl of Kajagoogoo covered the song. It entered the Heritage Charts in March, and by mid-April reached the No. 2 position.

=== In media ===
The song is featured in Friends season 5 episode 22 (The One with Joey's Big Break), when Joey arrives at the set of the movie he's supposed to shoot.

It appears in the 2004 video game Grand Theft Auto: San Andreas as part of the radio station K-DST.

The song also appears in Breaking Bad Season 3 episode "Caballo sin Nombre" (Spanish for "A Horse with No Name"), in a scene where Walter White drives through a desert. Bunnell said the episode was his favourite time a show or movie featured one of his songs. The song was later featured in a limited-edition vinyl box to celebrate the show's 10-year anniversary.

In the 2017 season 4 episode of BoJack Horseman "The Old Sugarman Place", the title character BoJack Horseman (Will Arnett) drives through the desert to Patrick Carney and Michelle Branch's interpretation of the song. This version also appears on the soundtrack album of the series.

=== Musical references ===
Michael Jackson's song "A Place with No Name" was released posthumously by TMZ as a 25-second snippet on July 16, 2009. The snippet closely resembles "A Horse with No Name". Jim Morey, both Jackson's and America's former band manager, has stated that "America was honored that Michael chose to do their song and they hope it becomes available for all Michael's fans to hear." The song was remastered and released in its entirety along with the original Michael Jackson recording on Jackson's album, Xscape (2014).

The song was sampled by Milo in his song "Geometry and Theology" from his mixtape Cavalcade, in which every song samples a song by America.

The song is name-checked in the Tin Machine song "Stateside" on their second and final studio album Tin Machine II (1991).

The title of the debut studio album by the Loud Family, Plants and Birds and Rocks and Things (1993), is taken from the song.

== Charts ==
=== Weekly charts ===
Chart (1971–1972)	Peak position
Australia (Kent Music Report)	2
Belgium (Ultratop 50 Flanders)	29
Canada (RPM) Top Singles	1
Canada (RPM) Adult Contemporary	12
France (SNEP)	17
Finland (Suomen virallinen lista)	1
Ireland (IRMA)	4
Netherlands (Single Top 100)	12
Russia	3
New Zealand (Listener)	5
Spain (AFE)	12
UK Singles (Official Charts)	3
US Billboard Hot 100	1
US Easy Listening (Billboard)	3
US Cash Box Top 100	1
US Record World Singles	1

=== Year-end charts ===
Chart (1972)	Position
Canada Top Singles (RPM)	5
US Billboard Hot 100	27

== Certifications ==
Region	Certification	Certified units/sales
Italy (FIMI)	Platinum	100,000^{‡}
New Zealand (RMNZ)	5× Platinum	150,000^{‡}
Spain (Promusicae)	Platinum	60,000^{‡}
United Kingdom (BPI)	Platinum	600,000^{‡}
United States (RIAA)	Gold	1,000,000^{^}
^{^} Shipments figures based on certification alone.^{‡} Sales+streaming figures based on certification alone.
