= Dan Peek =

American musician (1950–2011)

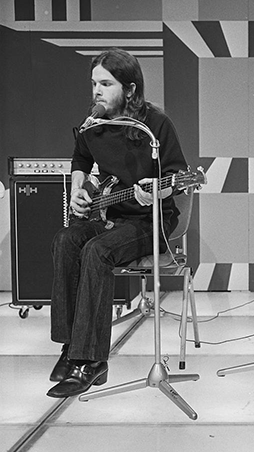
- Peek performing in 1972

Background information
- Born: Daniel Milton Peek; November 1, 1950; Panama City, Florida, U.S.
- Died: July 24, 2011 (aged 60) Farmington, Missouri, U.S.
- Genres: Folk rock; soft rock; country rock; contemporary Christian
- Instruments: Vocals; guitar; bass guitar; keyboards; harmonica
- Years active: 1969–2011
- Labels: Warner Bros.; Lamb & Lion
- Formerly of: America

Daniel Milton Peek (November 1, 1950 – July 24, 2011) was an American musician, singer, and songwriter, best known as the co-founder of the band America, and later a "pioneer" in contemporary Christian music.

== Early life ==
Peek was born in Panama City, Florida, on November 1, 1950, while his father was in the U.S. Air Force.

Beginning in 1963, Peek was educated at London Central Elementary High School at Bushey Hall in North London. For the 1965–66 school year, Peek attended San Angelo Central High School after his family relocated from Pakistan earlier that year. He moved again to England in 1968 with his family when his father was assigned to a base in London. It was there that he met Dewey Bunnell and Gerry Beckley at London Central High School.

In 1973, he married Catherine Maberry (d. March 11, 2021), with whom he would write a number of songs, including "Lonely People".

When Peek was young he suffered from rheumatoid arthritis and had to be hospitalized 100 miles (160 km) away from the family home; his parents could visit only occasionally. Peek remembered this experience when, about a year before he died, he decided to dispose of five of his vintage guitars. Because the Ronald McDonald Houses exist to provide housing for families of hospitalized children close to hospitals around the United States and the world, Peek donated these five guitars to the San Diego house, where they were subsequently sold to a collector, resulting in a $50,000 donation (equivalent to $74,000 in 2025).

== Career ==
=== America ===
After a brief stint at Old Dominion University in Virginia during 1969, Peek returned to London. Soon afterwards, the three former London Central High School classmates Peek, Beckley, and Bunnell began making music together. Known for singing the high harmonies, Peek contributed lead and backing vocals, guitars, bass, keyboards, and harmonica to their recordings during his tenure in the band. As a member of America, Peek wrote or co-wrote four Top 100 singles: "Don't Cross the River" (No. 35), "Lonely People" (No. 5), "Woman Tonight" (No. 44), and "Today's the Day" (No. 23), for all of which he also sang lead vocals. "Lonely People" and "Today's the Day" also hit No. 1 on the Billboard AC charts.

Peek abused alcohol and other drugs during his time touring with the band and elected to leave shortly after America's February 1977 release of the Harbor album, disenchanted with the travel, recreational drug use, and female groupies. In 2004, he released an autobiography about that era entitled An American Band: The America Story which was "very difficult" for him to write because of the bad memories it brought up.

=== Contemporary Christian music ===
Years of life on the road with America had taken a toll on him. He renounced drugs and alcohol, renewed his Christian faith, and began to seek a different artistic direction than Beckley or Bunnell. He went on to sign with Pat Boone's Lamb & Lion Records and found renewed success as an artist in the emerging Christian pop music genre.

Peek's debut solo album, All Things Are Possible, was released in 1979. Chris Christian co-wrote, produced, and contributed acoustic guitar and backing vocals on the album. The title track reached the Billboard charts, making the Top 10 on the A/C Billboard chart and number 1 in the Christian charts, becoming one of the earliest contemporary Christian music crossover hits. Another song on the album, "Love Was Just Another Word", was recorded in Los Angeles and written by Chris Christian and Steve Kipner. Gerry Beckley and Dewey Bunnell contributed the background vocals. This was the last time the three original members of America recorded together. At the 22nd Grammy Awards, the album was nominated, losing in the Contemporary Gospel category to The Imperials album Heed the Call.

Peek waited five years before releasing a second solo album, 1984's Doer of the Word, which hit number 2 on the Christian charts. Gerry Beckley contributed background vocals, which were recorded at Chris Christian's studio in Los Angeles while Peek was there. 1986 saw the release of his Electrovoice album, again to the CCM market, which included a remake of "Lonely People", featuring a very similar lead vocal treatment and overall arrangement to the original America version. He changed some of the song's lyrics to reflect his Christian faith; for example, the lines "And ride that highway in the sky" and "You never know until you try" became "And give your heart to Jesus Christ".

Peek spent much of the 1990s in semi-retirement, occasionally recording music at his home in Bodden Town, Grand Cayman Island. He released several solo projects and collaborated with Ken Marvin and Brian Gentry as "Peace" on three albums. In the years before his death, Peek released music via his website. His last musical collaboration was performing lead vocal on a track on the 2011 album Steps on the Water by Etcetera.

He published An American Band, an autobiography based on America's most successful period, and his own spiritual journey.

== Death ==
Peek died in his sleep of uremic pericarditis on July 24, 2011, at the age of 60 at his home in Farmington, Missouri. He was interred in Farmington's Zolman Cemetery.

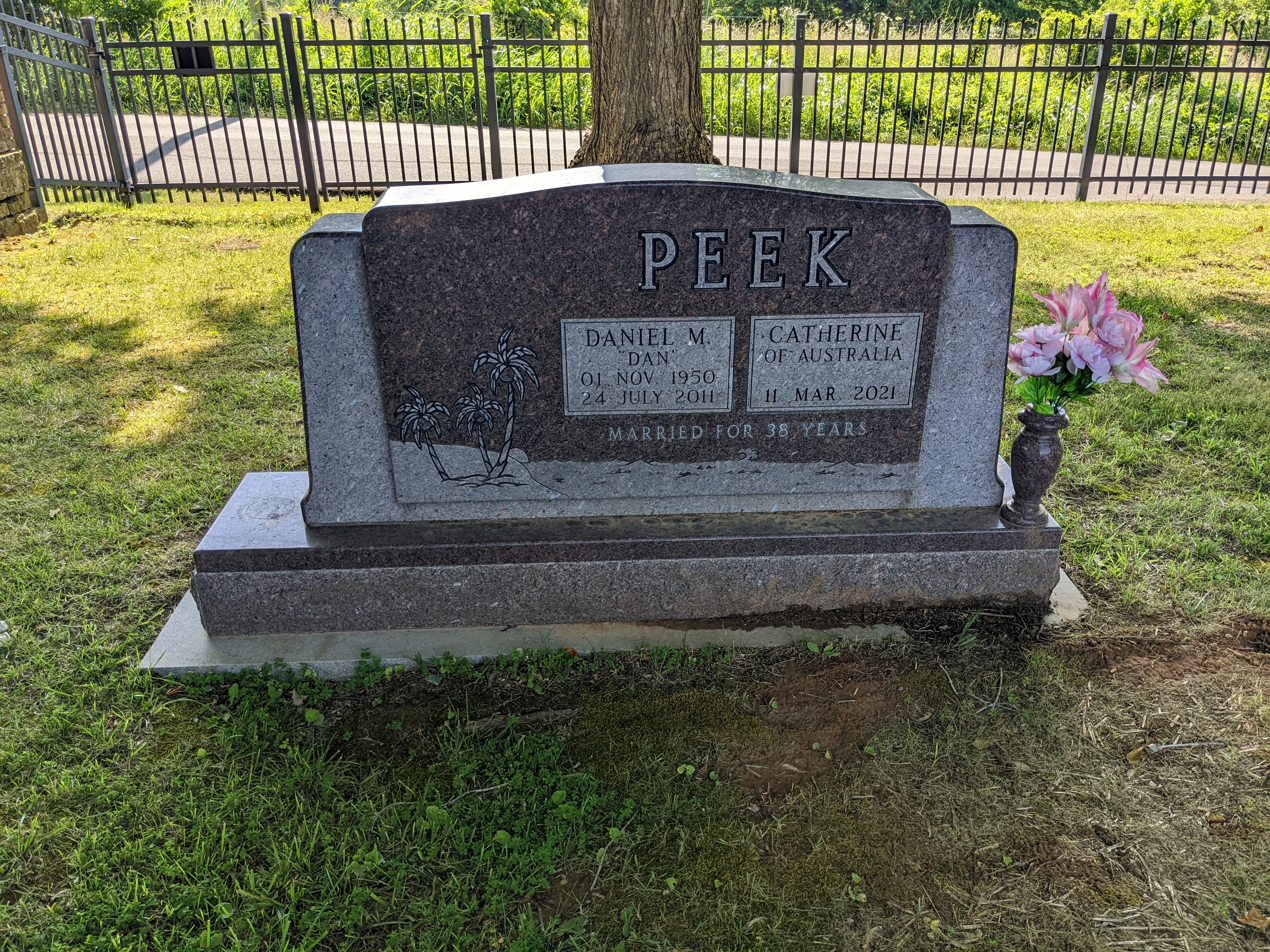
Gravestone of Dan and Catherine Peek in Zolman Cemetery in Farmington, Missouri, U.S.

== Discography ==
See also America discography

Year	Single / Track	CCM	CCM AC	BB	AC	CAN AC	Album	Notes
1979	"All Things Are Possible"	1	1	78	6	—	All Things Are Possible	13 weeks at No. 1. Grammy Award nomination.
1979	"The Star"	—	—	—	—	—	On This Christmas Night (various artists)	produced by Chris Christian
1980	"Ready for Love"	—	—	—	—	7	All Things Are Possible	produced by Chris Christian
1981	"Divine Lady"	23	25	—	—	—	All Things Are Possible	produced by Chris Christian
1984	"Doer of the Word"	2	2	—	—	—	Doer of the Word	backing vocal by Gerry Beckley
1984	"Redeemer"	—	26	—	—	—	Doer of the Word	produced by Chris Christian
1985	"Holy Spirit"	—	39	—	—	—	Doer of the Word	produced by Chris Christian
1986	"Lonely People"	2	1	—	—	—	Electro-Voice	No. 1 four weeks. Remake of America's 1975 hit.
1986	"Electro Voice"	7	33	—	—	—	Electro-Voice	
1986	"Sleep Baby Jesus"	—	—	—	—	—	Christmas Greetings (various artists)	
1987	"A New Song"	—	18	—	—	—	Electro-Voice	
1987	"Cross Over"	13	17	—	—	—	Cross Over	
1987	"I Will Not Be Silent"	—	24	—	—	—	Cross Over	
1988	"My American Dream"	—	—	—	—	—	non-album single	
1988	"Love Was Just Another Word"	—	—	—	—	—	The Best of Dan Peek (compilation)	backing vocal by America
1989	"Living Water"	—	—	—	—	—	Light of the World	with Ken Marvin and Brian Gentry
1997	"Summer Rain"	—	—	—	—	—	Peace	Peace (with Marvin and Gentry)
1999	"Bodden Town"	—	—	—	—	—	Bodden Town	
2000	"On Wings of Eagles"	—	—	—	—	—	Under the Mercy	Peace (with Marvin and Gentry)
2000	"Mary's Boy Child"	—	—	—	—	—	Caribbean Christmas	instrumental
2001	"Driftin' "	—	—	—	—	—	Driftin' Tales From The Lost Islands	
2002	"Guitar Man"	—	—	—	—	—	Guitar Man	
2006	"I Spent the Summer South of the Border"	—	—	—	—	—	Release the Endorphins	with The Endorphins
2006	"Refugee-Song"	—	—	—	—	—	Guitar Man II	digital download
2007	"All American Boy"	—	—	—	—	—	All American Boy	digital download
2008	"Velvet Elvis"	—	—	—	—	—	Meet the Endorphins	with The Endorphins
2011	"Kiss Me on the Waves"	—	—	—	—	—	Steps on the Water	Etcetera featuring Dan Peek
2012		—	—	—	—	—	Greatest Hits	digital download, compilation
2012		—	—	—	—	—	Christian Artists Series: Dan Peek, Vol. 1	digital download, compilation
2012		—	—	—	—	—	Christian Artists Series: Dan Peek, Vol. 2	digital download, compilation
2012		—	—	—	—	—	Christian Artists Series: Dan Peek & Friends (various artists)	digital download, compilation
2012		—	—	—	—	—	Christmas with Dan Peek and Friends (various artists)	digital download, compilation
2014	"Endless Flight" (remix)	—	—	—	—	—	non-album single	Remix by Laredo
2018	"Right Now" (remix)	—	—	—	—	—	Peace Revisited	Remix by Marvin and Gentry
2019	"Still Love You" (remix)	—	—	—	—	—	Peace Revisited	Remix by Marvin and Gentry
2020	"Blue Skies, Blue Eyes" (remix)	—	—	—	—	—	Peace Revisited	Remix by Marvin and Gentry
2021	"Little Darlin" (remix)	—	—	—	—	—	non-album single	Remix by Ken Marvin
