= Gerry Beckley =

American musician (born 1952)

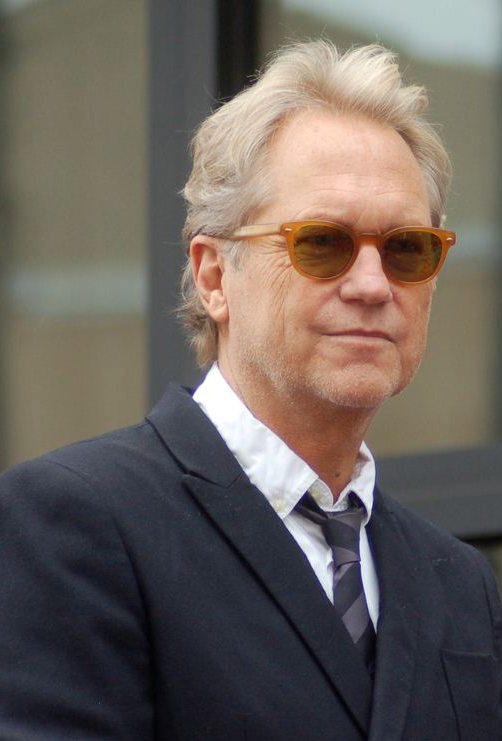
- Beckley in 2012

Background information
- Born: Gerald Linford Beckley; September 12, 1952 (age 74); Fort Worth, Texas, U.S.
- Genres: Rock; acoustic
- Occupations: Singer-songwriter; musician
- Instruments: Vocals; guitar; bass guitar; keyboards; harmonica
- Years active: 1967–present
- Labels: Warner Bros.; Capitol; Rhino; American Gramaphone; Oxygen; Burgundy
- Member of: America
- Website: gerrybeckley.com

Gerald Linford Beckley (born September 12, 1952) is an American singer, songwriter and musician, and a founding member of the band America.

== Early life ==
Beckley was born to an American father and an English mother. He began playing the piano at the age of three and the guitar a few years later. By 1962, Beckley was playing guitar in The Vanguards (not to be confused with the Norwegian band), an instrumental surf music band in Virginia. He spent every summer in England and soon discovered British Invasion music.

== Career ==
In 1967, Beckley's father became the commander at the United States Air Force base at RAF West Ruislip, near London. Gerry attended London Central High School in Bushey Hall in Hertfordshire, where he played in various school bands and met his soon-to-be bandmates, Dewey Bunnell and Dan Peek. Originally, the group played on Friday nights at the local American teen club, mostly doing acoustic covers of Crosby, Stills & Nash tunes. The original drummer was a classmate, Dave Atwood.

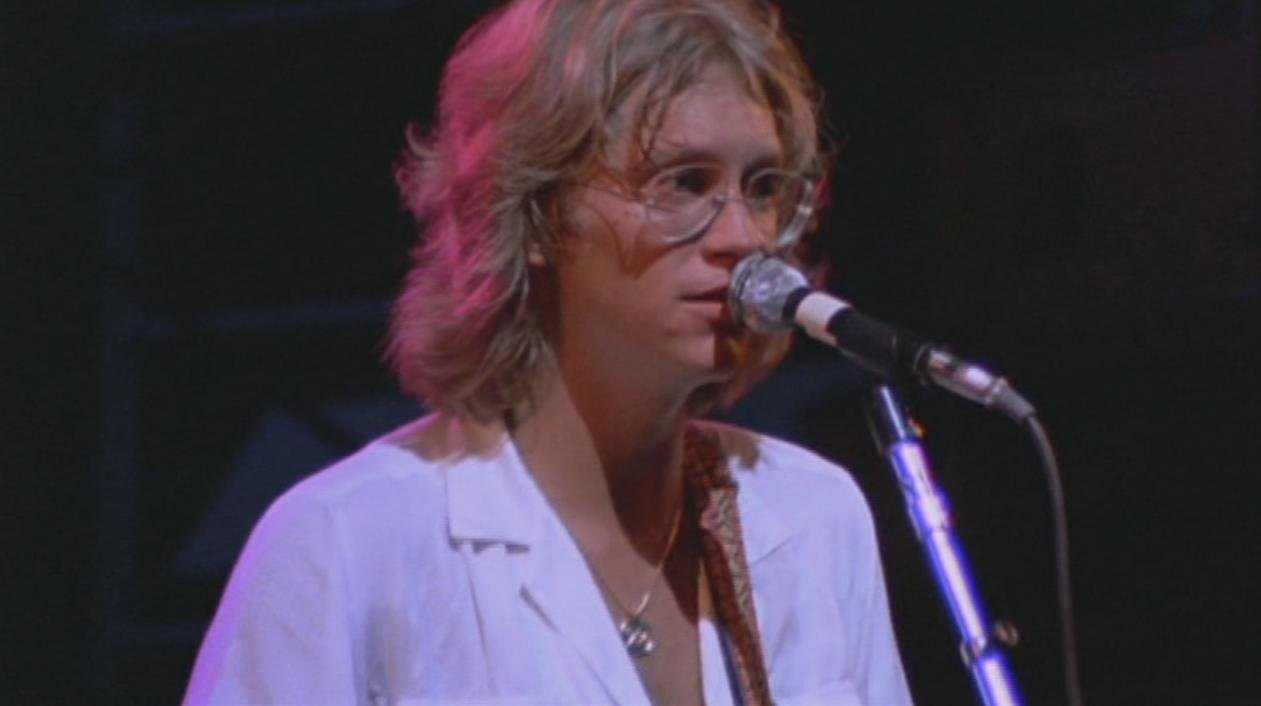
Beckley singing at the 1979 Dr. Pepper Central Park Music Festival

America signed a recording contract with the British division of Warner Bros. Records and found success in 1972 with "A Horse with No Name".

Beckley wrote and sang America's 1972 top-10 hit "I Need You" and its 1975 number-one hit "Sister Golden Hair", as well as its top-20 follow-up "Daisy Jane". He also sang their '80s top-10 hit "You Can Do Magic".

Beckley continues to write and record music both as a solo artist and with other musicians. With Bunnell, Beckley continued touring worldwide with America for five decades. In 2024, Beckley announced his retirement from touring with America, although he stated he would remain a member of the band.

=== Solo projects ===
In the 1990 John Waters film Cry-Baby, Beckley, Andrew Gold, and Timothy B. Schmit appeared as Baldwin and the Whiffles, performing "Mister Sandman", "The Naughty Lady of Shady Lane", and "Sh-Boom".

Beckley has worked with a wide variety of musicians on many projects. In the mid-1970s, he collaborated with David Cassidy on Cassidy's critically acclaimed RCA albums, co-writing, singing, and co-producing. From 1992 to 1997 he collaborated with Carl Wilson of The Beach Boys, and Robert Lamm of Chicago, culminating with the 2000 release of Like a Brother, Wilson's final recordings before his death in 1998.

In May 2006, Beckley released another solo album, Horizontal Fall.

In March 2007, Beckley appeared as a guest on the Australian musical quiz TV show Spicks and Specks. In April 2007, he appeared as a special guest at a Ben Kweller show in Melbourne, Australia. Beckley, Kweller, and the band performed "Sister Golden Hair" together.

Beckley debuted his 2016 Blue Elan Records solo album Carousel on September 7, 2016, with a live performance at the Whisky a Go Go in Hollywood, California.

In addition to music, Beckley has pursued projects in photography and fashion. In 2022, he released a collection of limited-edition T-shirts and hoodies with the clothing label Todd Snyder.

== Personal life ==
Beckley was married to Eleanor Beckley from 1978 to 1982 and then to Kathy Beckley. He has two sons, Matthew (born July 16, 1983) and Joe (born February 22, 1992). Matthew is also a musician; he has toured with Katy Perry and has worked with other artists, including Ke$ha and Britney Spears. Joe is an aspiring photographer in the Los Angeles area. Beckley, now married to an Australian, splits his time between homes in California and Australia.

== Discography ==
=== Solo albums ===
- Van Go Gan (1995)
- Go Man Go (2000)
- Horizontal Fall (2006)
- Happy Hour (2009)
- Unfortunate Casino (2011)
- Carousel (2016)
- Five Mile Road (2019) (US Americana/Folk Album Sales Chart No. 23)
- Discovering America (2020) - Recorded June 1970 at Morgan Studios
- Keeping The Light On - The Best of Gerry Beckley (2021) - Compilation and new studio material
- Aurora (2022)
- Gerry Beckley (2024)
- Merciful (2026)

=== Collaborations ===
- Baldwin and the Whiffles - Cry-Baby Soundtrack (1990)
- Beckley, Lamm & Wilson - Like A Brother (2000)

== Sessions (selection) ==
- Mike Hugg - Somewhere (1972)
- Dan Fogelberg - Souvenirs (1974)
- David Cassidy - Home Is Where the Heart Is and Getting It in the Street (Both released in 1976)
- Ricci Martin - Beached (1977)
- Rick Danko - Rick Danko (1977)
- Dennis Wilson - Pacific Ocean Blue (1977)
- Dave Mason - Mariposa De Oro (1978)
- Jimmy Webb - Angel Heart (1982)
- Dan Peek - Doer of the Word (1984)
- Various Artists - Cry Baby – Original Soundtrack (1990)
- Modern Folk Quartet - Highway 70 (1995)
- Various Artists - For the Love of Harry – Everybody Sings Nilsson (1995)
- Robert Lamm - In My Head (1999)
- Jeff Larson - Room for the Summer (2000)
- Jeffrey Foskett - Twelve And Twelve (2000)
- Les Deux Love Orchestra - Music From Les Deux Cafés (2001)
- Jeff Larson - Fragile Sunrise (2002)
- Low - Trust (2002)
- Robert Lamm - Subtlety And Passion (2003)
- Jeff Larson - Sepia (2004)
- Low - Great Destroyer (2005)
- Les Deux Love Orchestra - King Kong (2005)
- Brian Wilson a.o. - One World Project (2005)
- Bill Mumy - With Big Ideas (2006)
- Les Deux Love Orchestra - Ecstasy (2008)
- Al Jardine - A Postcard From California (2009)
- Jeff Larson - Heart of the Valley (2009)
- Les Deux Love Orchestra - Planet Claire 3D Maxi-Single (2009)
- Nick Vernier Band - Sessions (2010)
