= Dewey Bunnell =

British and American musician (born 1952)

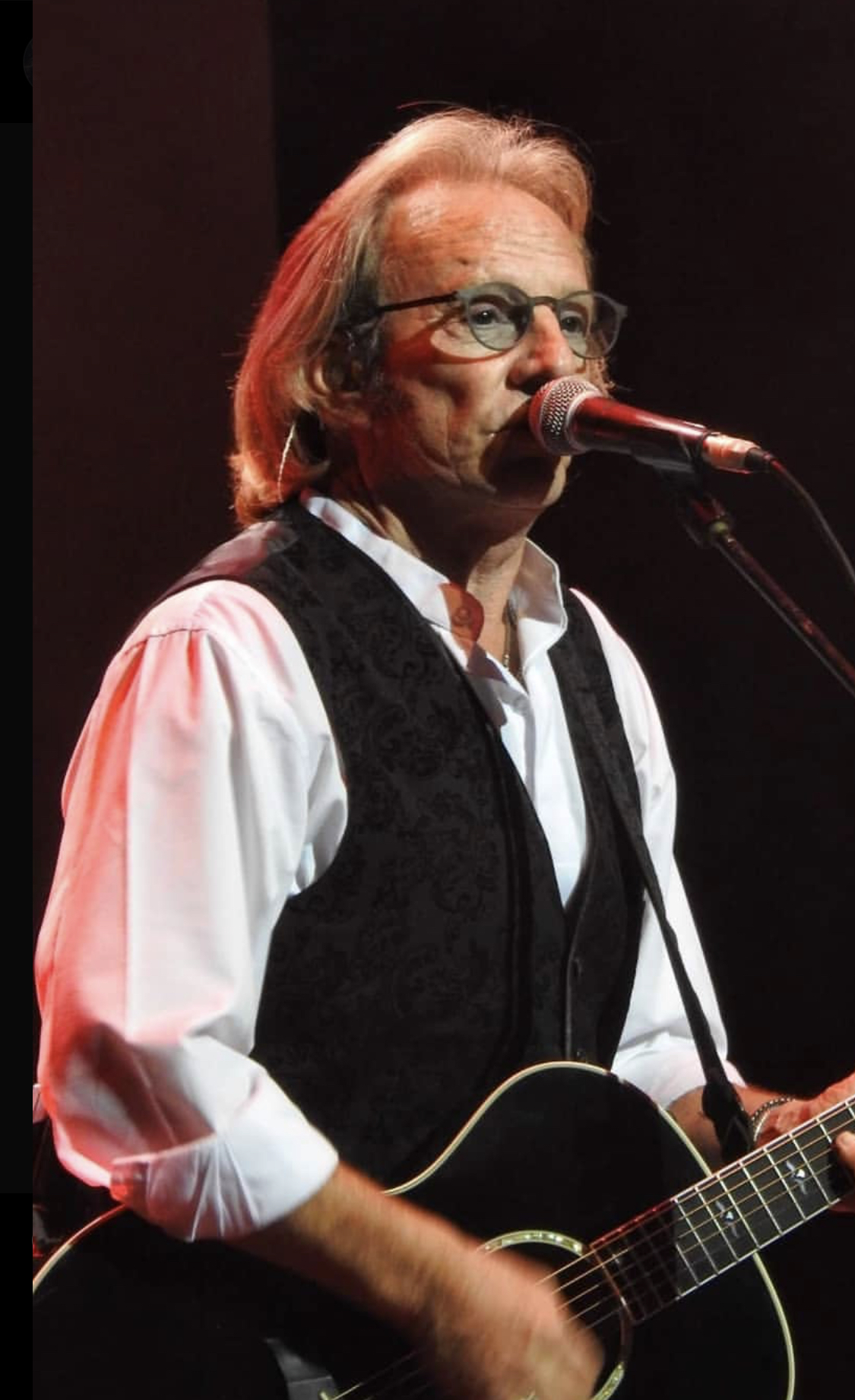
- Bunnell in 2019

Background information
- Born: Lee Merton Bunnell; January 19, 1952 (age 74); Harrogate, Yorkshire, England
- Occupation: Musician
- Instruments: Vocals; guitar; percussion
- Years active: 1969–present
- Member of: America

Lee Merton "Dewey" Bunnell (born January 19, 1952) is a British and American musician, singer and songwriter, best known as a founding member of the rock band America.

== Music career ==
After an initial attempt at forming a band in the late 1960s, Bunnell, Beckley, and Peek formed America in 1969 and released their first album in 1971. As with the other members, Bunnell wrote, sang and played guitar. His best-known compositions include "A Horse with No Name", "Ventura Highway", and "Tin Man". Bunnell has explained that "A Horse with No Name" was "a metaphor for a vehicle to get away from life's confusion into a quiet, peaceful place", while "Sandman" was inspired by his casual talks with returning Vietnam veterans. Afraid that they might be attacked and killed in their sleep, many of them chose to stay awake as long as possible, either naturally or with pharmaceuticals. Thus, they were "running from the Sandman."

Bunnell is still a member of America, along with the remaining founding member, Gerry Beckley. America has made more than 20 albums of original material, along with a number of hits compilations, between the 1960s and the present. In 2002, the band released a holiday album entitled Holiday Harmony. America's album Back Pages was released on 26 July 2011. The group was given a star on the Hollywood Walk of Fame in February 2012. America's most recent album, Lost & Found, was officially released 5 May 2015, containing unreleased tracks recorded between 2002 and 2010.

== Personal life ==
Bunnell was born in Harrogate, Yorkshire, England, to an American serviceman father, stationed at the United States Air Force base at RAF South Ruislip, and his English wife. As a young musician, Bunnell was inspired by the Beatles and the Beach Boys. While attending London Central High School in England, he met Gerry Beckley and Dan Peek. In 1973, he moved to Marin County, California, with his then-wife, Vivien. They had two children, Dylan and Lauren. The two divorced in 1999 and he married Penny in 2002. He then legally adopted Penny's daughter, Destry.
