= History: America's Greatest Hits =

Greatest hits album by America
- Released: November 3, 1975
- Recorded: 1971–1975
- Studios: Trident, London; Morgan, London; The Record Plant, Los Angeles; AIR, London; The Record Plant, Sausalito, California
- Genres: Pop; rock
- Length: 38:21
- Label: Warner Bros.
- Producer: George Martin

America chronology
| Hearts (1975) | History: America's Greatest Hits (1975) | Hideaway (1976) |

Professional ratings
Review scores
| Source | Rating |
|---|---|
| AllMusic | 4.5/5 stars |
| Christgau's Record Guide | C− |
| The Rolling Stone Album Guide | 3/5 stars |

History: America's Greatest Hits is the first greatest hits album by American folk rock trio America, released by Warner Bros. Records in 1975. The album was produced by George Martin, the third of six consecutive studio albums he produced for America, even though 7 of the 12 tracks were recorded before he started working with the group.

It was a success in the United States, reaching number 3 on the Billboard album chart and being certified multi-platinum by the RIAA. It has also been certified 6 times platinum by ARIA for shipments of 420,000 copies in Australia. History: America's Greatest Hits reached 41 on the Billboard Top Pop Catalog Albums Chart in 2007, number 90 on the Billboard Top Album Sales Chart and 50 Top Rock Albums Chart in 2019.

== History ==
By late 1975, America had released five commercially successful studio albums and a number of hit singles, including two number one hits. Their second number one hit, "Sister Golden Hair", had topped the charts that summer. Warner Bros. Records decided to capitalize on the group's commercial momentum and growing catalogue by issuing a greatest hits compilation.

The resulting compilation, released in November 1975, contained all eleven of America's charting singles to date, along with an edited version of "Sandman", a popular track from the debut album that had never been released as a single.

The album's name, History, keeps the group's tradition of album names beginning with the letter "H".

== Remixed tracks ==
The first seven tracks of the album, having been recorded prior to producer George Martin's involvement with the group, were remixed by Martin for this release, with several notable differences from the original mixes. Some of the remixed tracks, such as "A Horse with No Name" and "I Need You", feature a more prominent bass. A voice can briefly be heard in the background of "A Horse with No Name" about two minutes into the track—this voice is not on the original recording. The pitch on "I Need You" is slowed a quarter tone from the original version. "Sandman" runs about one minute shorter than the original mix. On "Ventura Highway", Dewey Bunnell's lead vocal is double-tracked and the guitars have significantly more reverb. "Don't Cross the River" adds a fiddle not heard in the original recording. In addition, several of the tracks are crossfaded to eliminate the breaks between songs.

Due to the commercial success and enduring popularity of this album, over time the remixed versions of America's hits on History have become as recognizable in popular culture as the original singles themselves.

== Cover artwork ==
The cover artwork partly draws from artwork on America's previous albums. The drawings of Dan Peek and Dewey Bunnell are taken from photos on a poster included with the Hat Trick album. The image of the car and the trees behind it (the latter which also form Gerry Beckley's shirt) come from the cover of the Holiday album. The Golden Gate Bridge and pine trees are adapted from the cover of Hearts. Although images of Big Ben and the double-decker bus are not found on any other America album, their inclusion symbolizes the group's origins in England. The artwork was by a then-unknown artist named Phil Hartman, later famous as an actor and comedian, and brother of the group's then-manager, John Hartmann. The liner notes spell his last name as "Hartmann"—the original spelling of his name.

== Track listing ==
=== Side 1 ===
| No. | Title | Writer(s) | Length |
|---|---|---|---|
| 1. | "A Horse with No Name" | Dewey Bunnell | 4:10 |
| 2. | "I Need You" | Gerry Beckley | 3:04 |
| 3. | "Sandman" | Bunnell | 4:03 |
| 4. | "Ventura Highway" | Bunnell | 3:32 |
| 5. | "Don't Cross the River" | Dan Peek | 2:30 |
| 6. | "Only in Your Heart" | Beckley | 3:16 |

=== Side 2 ===
| No. | Title | Writer(s) | Length |
|---|---|---|---|
| 1. | "Muskrat Love" | Willis Alan Ramsey | 3:02 |
| 2. | "Tin Man" | Bunnell | 3:25 |
| 3. | "Lonely People" | D. Peek, Catherine Peek | 2:27 |
| 4. | "Sister Golden Hair" | Beckley | 3:16 |
| 5. | "Daisy Jane" | Beckley | 3:07 |
| 6. | "Woman Tonight" | D. Peek | 2:19 |

(The positions of "Only in Your Heart" and "Woman Tonight" in the track listing are reversed on the cassette tape version.)

The cassette version produced in Canada by Warner Music Canada (a Warner Music Group company) 1975 has the following order:

=== Side 1 ===
| No. | Title | Writer(s) | Length |
|---|---|---|---|
| 1. | "A Horse with No Name" | Dewey Bunnell | 4:10 |
| 2. | "I Need You" | Gerry Beckley | 3:04 |
| 3. | "Woman Tonight" | Dan Peek | 2:19 |
| 4. | "Sister Golden Hair" | Gerry Beckley | 3:16 |
| 5. | "Daisy Jane" | Gerry Beckley | 3:07 |
| 6. | "Muskrat Love" | Willis Alan Ramsey | 3:02 |

=== Side 2 ===
| No. | Title | Writer(s) | Length |
|---|---|---|---|
| 1. | "Lonely People" | Catherine Peek, Dan Peek | 2:27 |
| 2. | "Sandman" | Dewey Bunnell | 5:03 |
| 3. | "Only in Your Heart" | Gerry Beckley | 3:16 |
| 4. | "Ventura Highway" | Dewey Bunnell | 3:22 |
| 5. | "Don't Cross the River" | Dan Peek | 2:30 |
| 6. | "Tin Man" | Dewey Bunnell | 3:25 |

== Charts ==
=== Weekly charts ===
| Chart (1976) | Peak position |
|---|---|
| Australian Albums (Kent Music Report) | 11 |
| Canada Top Albums/CDs (RPM) | 1 |
| French Albums (SNEP) | 25 |
| New Zealand Albums (RMNZ) | 3 |
| UK Albums (Official Charts) | 60 |
| US Billboard 200 | 3 |

| Chart (2019–2025) | Peak position |
|---|---|
| US Top Rock & Alternative Albums (Billboard) | 48 |

=== Year-end charts ===
| Chart (1975) | Position |
|---|---|
| Canada Top Albums/CDs (RPM) | 86 |
| New Zealand Albums (RMNZ) | 9 |

| Chart (1976) | Position |
|---|---|
| Canada Top Albums/CDs (RPM) | 12 |
| New Zealand Albums (RMNZ) | 13 |
| US Billboard 200 | 9 |

== Certifications and sales ==
| Region | Certification | Certified units/sales |
|---|---|---|
| Australia (ARIA) | 6× Platinum | 420,000^{^} |
| Canada (Music Canada) | Platinum | 100,000^{^} |
| United Kingdom (BPI) | Silver | 60,000^{^} |
| United States (RIAA) | 4× Platinum | 4,000,000^{^} |
^{^} Shipments figures based on certification alone.
