= Live from Agora =

Live album by Dwight Twilley Band
- Released: 2009
- Recorded: 1976
- Genre: Rock
- Label: Gigatone (U.S.)
- Producer: Mitchell Koulouris; Dwight Twilley

Dwight Twilley Band chronology
The Great Lost Twilley Album (1993)	Live from Agora (2009)

Professional ratings
Review scores
Source	Rating
Allmusic	4.5/5 stars

Live from Agora was the fourth and final album from the Dwight Twilley Band, recorded live in October 1976 and released in 2009 on Gigatone Records. The album consists of a recording of a live performance of the band at the Agora Theatre and Ballroom in Cleveland, Ohio, which had been taped for broadcast on Cleveland radio station WMMS.

== History ==
In late 1976, the Dwight Twilley Band was sent on a midwestern promotional tour by Shelter Records and its new distribution partner Arista Records, in an effort to gain exposure for the band, which had been idled by the collapse of Shelter. At the time, the Cleveland Agora was located underneath Agency Recording Studios, and professional-quality recordings were made of many of the live concerts, using Agency's equipment, for radio rebroadcast. The tape of this concert was later edited for national broadcast on the King Biscuit Flower Hour, but it was not released commercially for over three decades.

The band on this tour consisted of Dwight Twilley (guitar, keyboards, lead and harmony vocals), Phil Seymour (drums, percussion, lead and harmony vocals) and Bill Pitcock IV (lead guitar), with backing musicians including Bingo Sloan (bass) and Rob Armstrong (drums). The band performed five songs from its debut album Sincerely, five songs from the upcoming second album Twilley Don't Mind, two songs that ultimately appeared on The Great Lost Twilley Album and one song ("Betsy Sue") that had only been released in a Dwight Twilley solo version, even though Twilley wrote it during his teens.

The original release of this album was done pursuant to a deal that Twilley had signed with Gigatone Records, as part of a deluge of previously-unissued Twilley releases. In 2026, the album was remastered and reissued by Iconoclassic Records under the title Live on Fire at the Agora 1976. One additional song from Sincerely that had been performed but then cut from the original radio tapes, "Looking for the Magic", was included in the new release.

== Track listing ==
All songs written by Dwight Twilley

1. "Shakin' in the Brown Grass"
2. "Just Like the Sun"
3. "Chance to Get Away"
4. "Could Be Love"
5. "Trying to Find My Baby"
6. "Betsy Sue"
7. "I'm on Fire"
8. "Looking for the Magic" (Iconoclassic reissue only)
9. "Twilley Don't Mind"
10. "Here She Comes"
11. "Sky Writer"
12. "TV"
13. "Rock and Roll 47"
14. "England"

== Personnel ==
=== Musicians ===
- Dwight Twilley: lead and harmony vocals, guitar, keyboards
- Phil Seymour: lead and harmony vocals, drums, percussion
- Bill Pitcock IV: lead guitar
- Bingo Sloan: bass
- Rob Armstrong: drums
