= Crossover =

Crossover may refer to:

== Entertainment ==
=== Music ===
==== Albums ====
- Crossover (Dirty Rotten Imbeciles album), 1987
- Crossover (Yoshinori Sunahara album), 1995
- Cross Over (album), 1987, by Dan Peek, or the title song
- Crossover, an album by Intrigue
- Crossover, an album by Hitomi Shimatani

==== Songs ====
- "Crossover" (song), 1992, by EPMD
- "Cross Over" (song), 2010, by the Japanese group 9nine

==== Genres and styles ====
- Crossover music
- Crossover thrash

=== Comics ===
- Crossover (Image Comics), 2020
- Crossover (storyline), a 2005 Fantastic Four storyline
- The Crossovers, a 2003 CrossGen comic book series
- Cross Over, a 2002 manga by Kōji Seo

=== Film and television ===
- Crossover (1980 film)
- Crossover (2006 film), a basketball film
- "Crossover" (Adventure Time), a 2016 episode
- "Crossover" (Star Trek: Deep Space Nine), a 1994 episode
- The Crossover (TV series), a 2023 series based on the novel by Kwame Alexander

=== Other entertainment ===
- Crossover (fiction), combining characters or settings in a single story
  - Intercompany crossover, of characters owned by different companies
- Crossover (theater), a walkway across the stage hidden from the audience
- Crossover (video games)
- The Crossover, a 2014 book by Kwame Alexander

== Science ==
- Crossover (evolutionary algorithm), combining genetics of two parents
- Crossover experiment (chemistry), with two simultaneous reactants
- Crossover study, medical study with different treatments
- Crossover distortion, in electronics
- Chromosomal crossover, an exchange of genetic material
- Mitotic crossover, a type of genetic recombination

== Sports ==
- Crossover (figure skating)
- Crossover (football trick)
- Crossover dribble, a basketball move
- Colorado Crossover, a basketball team
- Fayetteville Crossover, a North Carolina, US basketball team

== Technology ==
- Audio crossover, a frequency filter
- CrossOver (software), running Windows software under Linux
- Crossover cable
  - Ethernet crossover cable, connecting same-type devices
- Crossover switch, connecting multiple inputs and outputs

== Transportation ==
- Crossover SUV, unibody SUV
- Crossover (rail), a pair of switches that connects two parallel rail tracks that allows a train on one track to cross over to the other
- EuroSport Crossover, a light electric aircraft
- Aixam Crossover, a French quadricycle
- Mini Crossover, a subcompact crossover SUV sold in Japan as a rebadged Mini Countryman

== Other ==
- 105.1 Crossover, a former Philippines radio station
- Crossover effects in linguistics
- Crossover, ramps used in dog agility
