= Twilley =

Twilley may refer to:

- Dwight Twilley (1951–2023), American pop/rock singer and songwriter
  - Twilley (album), 1979
- Howard Twilley (1943–2025), American football player
- 5500 Twilley (1981 WR), a main belt asteroid
