= Song of Joy (album) =

Studio album by Captain & Tennille
- Released: February 27, 1976
- Studios: A&M (Hollywood); Whitney Recording (Glendale)
- Genre: Pop
- Length: 37:39
- Label: A&M
- Producers: Captain & Tennille

Captain & Tennille chronology
Love Will Keep Us Together (1975)	Song of Joy (1976)	Come in from the Rain (1977)

Singles from Song of Joy
- 1. "Lonely Night (Angel Face)" Released: January 1976; 2. "Shop Around" Released: 1976; 3. "Muskrat Love" Released: September 1976

Song of Joy is the second album by Captain & Tennille, released in 1976. Three out of the four singles released from the album were top-ten singles: "Muskrat Love", "Lonely Night (Angel Face)" and "Shop Around". The title track was co-written and originally performed by their A&M Records label mate Billy Preston.

== Track listing ==
1. "Song of Joy" (Billy Preston, Reginald Rasputin Boutte) - 3:14
2. "Lonely Night (Angel Face)" (Neil Sedaka) - 3:16
3. "Mind Your Love" (Jerry Reed Hubbard) - 2:59
4. "Smile for Me One More Time" (Toni Tennille) - 3:17
5. "Shop Around" (Smokey Robinson, Berry Gordy, Jr.) - 3:29
6. "Going Bananas" (Daryl Dragon) - 2:10
7. "Butterscotch Castle" (Toni Tennille, Daryl Dragon) - 3:19
8. "Muskrat Love" (Willis Alan Ramsey) - 3:48
9. "Thank You, Baby" (Bruce Johnston) - 3:38
10. "Wedding Song (There Is Love)" (Paul Stookey) - 3:18
11. "1954 Boogie Blues" (Toni Tennille, Daryl Dragon) - 4:54

Later in 1976, Pickwick Records re-issued Song of Joy, omitting "Mind Your Love" and "Butterscotch Castle".

== Singles ==
- "Lonely Night" (Angel Face) A&M 1782 b/w "Smile For Me One More Time" (No. 3 Hot 100, No. 1 Adult Contemporary)
- "Shop Around" A&M 1817 b/w "Butterscotch Castle" (No. 4 Hot 100, No. 1 Adult Contemporary)
- "Muskrat Love" A&M 1870 b/w "Honey Come Love Me" (No. 4 Hot 100, No. 1 Adult Contemporary)
- "Song of Joy" A&M 8601 b/w "Wedding Song (There Is Love)"

== Certifications ==
Certifications for "Song of Joy"
Region	Certification	Certified units/sales
Canada (Music Canada)	Platinum	100,000^{^}
United States (RIAA)	Platinum	1,000,000^{^}
^{^} Shipments figures based on certification alone.
