= The Great Lost Twilley Album =

Studio album by Dwight Twilley Band
- Released: 1993
- Recorded: 1974–1980
- Genre: Rock
- Length: 70:11
- Label: Shelter Records distributed by DCC (U.S.)
- Producer: Dwight Twilley; Phil Seymour

Dwight Twilley Band chronology
Twilley Don't Mind (1977)	The Great Lost Twilley Album (1993)	Live From Agora (2009)

Professional ratings
Review scores
Source	Rating
AllMusic	4/5 stars

The Great Lost Twilley Album is a compilation of songs from the Dwight Twilley Band and Dwight Twilley solo, recorded in 1974 through 1980 and released in 1993 on Shelter Records. The basic band consisted of Dwight Twilley (guitar, piano, lead and harmony vocals), Phil Seymour (drums, bass, percussion, lead and harmony vocals on the Dwight Twilley Band songs), and Bill Pitcock IV (lead guitar); other musicians include Leon Russell, Tom Petty and Susan Cowsill. Most of the production is credited to Twilley and Seymour, although some other producers who worked on songs on the record include Jack Nitzsche, Leon Russell, Robin Cable and Chuck Plotkin.

== Background ==
The songs on The Great Lost Twilley Album come from four distinct recording periods: the band's first Tulsa and Los Angeles sessions for Shelter Records in 1974 and 1975 (seven songs), a recording session produced by Robin Cable at Trident Studios in London (four songs), the period between Sincerely and Twilley Don't Mind (eight songs) and the solo Dwight Twilley recording sessions for Blueprint (six songs).

Although the band broke up in 1978, 15 of the 25 tracks included herein are from the unreleased albums Fire (which ultimately was released in altered form as Sincerely) and various editions of The B Album. Of the rest, two of the songs are the original mixes of the first Twilley Band single ("I'm On Fire" b/w "Did You-C-What Happened?"), two of the songs are demo tracks from the band's Twilley Don't Mind, two were released as solo singles by Dwight Twilley, and four were intended for the unissued Dwight Twilley solo album Blueprint. Thus, 19 of the 25 songs feature the Dwight Twilley Band, while six are solo Dwight Twilley numbers. Some of the other Cable-produced numbers ended up as bonus tracks on the CD issue of Sincerely. All in all, only two Cable-produced numbers are believed to have never been released: versions of Sky Blue and Shark (In The Dark), which appear on this collection in alternate recordings.

Shortly after the release of The Great Lost Twilley Album by DCC Compact Classics in 1993 through a licensing deal with Shelter Records, Shelter was purchased by EMI, and this album soon went out of print. Dwight Twilley has been quoted as saying that The Great Lost Twilley Album will be the last major release of previously unreleased Dwight Twilley Band numbers, for "legal reasons."

== Track listing ==
All songs written by Dwight Twilley.

1. "Somebody To Love" ++ – 3:44
2. "Then We Go Up" ++ – 2:06
3. "Burning Sand" ++ – 4:39
4. "Shakin' In The Brown Grass" – 2:16
5. "Shark (In The Dark)" – 2:30
6. "Sky Blue" ++ – 3:24
7. "Dancer" – 2:30
8. "Chance To Get Away" – 2:33
9. "Living In The City" – 2:31
10. "Firefly" ++ – 3:47
11. "Please Say Please" – 2:21
12. "Lovin' Me" – 2:15
13. "No Resistance" – 3:29
14. "I Love You So Much" ++ – 2:17
15. "I Don't Know My Name" – 2:17
16. "Didn't You Say" – 3:00
17. "The Two Of Us" – 2:23
18. "Twenty-Nine Times" – 2:18
19. "Skywriter" – 2:29
20. "You Never Listen To My Music" – 3:19
21. "Rock Yourself, Son" – 2:26
22. "I Can't Get No" – 2:20
23. "Did You-C-What Happened" – 3:16
24. "I'm On Fire" (original mix) – 3:14
25. "Rock And Roll 47" – 2:50

++ – Dwight Twilley solo songs

== Personnel ==
=== Producers ===
- Dwight Twilley and Phil Seymour

except: "Shark (In The Dark)" produced by Twilley, Seymour and "The Master of Time and Space" (Leon Russell);
"Rock Yourself, Son", "No Resistance", "I Don't Know My Name" and "Dancer" produced by Robin Cable;
"I Love You So Much" produced by Jack Nitzsche;
"Somebody To Love" produced by Twilley, Nitzsche and Bob Schaper;
"Then We Go Up" and "Burnin' Sand" produced by Noah Shark and Max with Dwight Twilley;
"Sky Blue" produced by Chuck Plotkin;
"Firefly" produced by Twilley.

- Engineers: Jim Barth, Roger Harris, Robin Cable, Ted Sharp, Bob Schaper, Mark Howllett; Noah Shark, Max, Clay Rose

=== Musicians ===
- Dwight Twilley: lead and harmony vocals, guitar, keyboards, harmonica, drums on "I Can't Get No"
- Phil Seymour: lead and harmony vocals, drums, percussion, bass, except on "I Can't Get No" and ++
- Bill Pitcock IV: lead guitar, bass on "I Can't Get No", "Then We Go Up", "Burnin' Sand", "Somebody To Love" and "Sky Blue"
- Johnny Johnson: bass on "Please Say Please" and "Didn't You Say"
- Leon Russell: piano and bass on "Feeling In The Dark" and "Shark (In The Dark)"
- Tom Petty: guitar on "Rock And Roll 47"
- Susan Cowsill: vocals on ++
- Jerry Naifeh: drums on "I Love You So Much" and "Somebody To Love"
- Jim Lewis: bass on "I Love You So Much", drums on "Then We Go Up" and "Burnin' Sand"
- John Cowsill: drums on "Sky Blue"
