= Phil Seymour =

American singer-songwriter and musician (1952–1993)

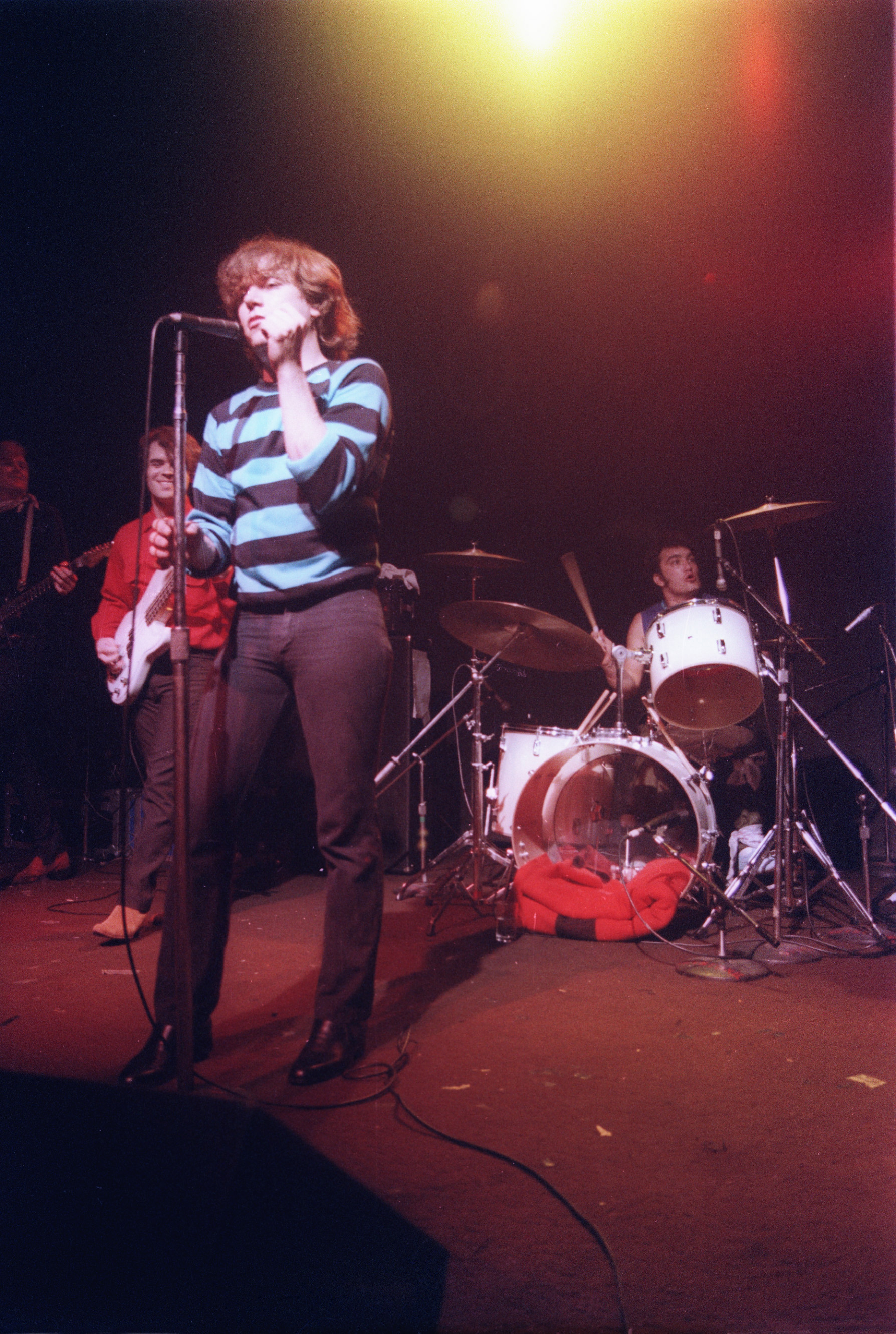
- Seymour in 1982

Background information
- Born: Philip Warren Seymour; May 15, 1952
- Origin: Oklahoma City, Oklahoma, U.S.
- Died: August 17, 1993 (aged 41) Tarzana Medical Center, Los Angeles, California, U.S.
- Genres: Rock; Power pop New wave
- Occupations: Singer-songwriter, drummer, guitarist, bassist, producer
- Instruments: Drums, bass guitar, guitar, vocals
- Years active: 1974–1993
- Labels: Shelter Records; Boardwalk Records; EMI
- Website: philseymour.org

Philip Warren Seymour (May 15, 1952 – August 17, 1993) was an American drummer, singer, guitarist and songwriter, best known for the singles "I'm on Fire" (with The Dwight Twilley Band), his own solo hit "Precious to Me" and for providing backing vocals on Tom Petty's hits "American Girl" and "Breakdown." His solo work is revered among fans of power pop.

== Dwight Twilley Band ==
In 1967, Seymour met fellow Tulsa musician Dwight Twilley at a theater where they had both gone to see a screening of A Hard Day's Night. They soon began writing and recording together, going by the name Oister. In 1974, Seymour and Twilley signed with Shelter Records and formed The Dwight Twilley Band.

I'll never forget the cold November night at the Church Studios in Tulsa. Phil and I had just signed our first recording contract. We had been instructed by the record company to get acquainted with working in a "real" 16-track studio and not to record a "real" record. In the confusion of a pivotal moment, it was Phil who pulled me into a secluded hallway and said "Dwight, let's make a hit record right now." That night we recorded "I'm on Fire."

— Dwight Twilley, in an excerpt from Phil Seymour's letter of remembrance.

"I'm on Fire", with little promotion, reached #16 on the Billboard Hot 100 for the week ending August 2, 1975. The Dwight Twilley Band recorded two albums together, with Phil and Dwight singing lead and harmony vocals, Phil playing drums and bass, Dwight playing guitar and vocals, and their friend Bill Pitcock IV contributing lead guitar. However, a string of unlucky breaks played a significant role in limiting their success. In 1978, Seymour left the band to pursue a solo career.

== Solo years ==
In the downtime between recording deals, he worked as a session musician as well as played drums for 20/20 on their self-titled first album as well as drums on Moon Martin's Shots from a Cold Nightmare album). Seymour sang backing vocals on four of Tom Petty's songs, "Breakdown," "American Girl," and "Strangered In The Night" from his debut album, along with "Magnolia" from Petty's sophomore effort. During 1978, Seymour also traveled to England to work on a solo recording with Denny Cordell producing - five songs were recorded with Chris Spedding on guitar. Two of the songs were released on the compilation Precious to Me and all five on the 2016 CD The London And Los Angeles Unreleased Sessions.

Phil Seymour, as seen on the cover of his first solo album

In 1980, Seymour signed to Boardwalk Records, and he released his first solo album, titled Phil Seymour, on January 16, 1981. The album was produced by Richie Podolor, who produced Seymour's second album and later produced Twilley's The Luck. "Precious to Me", the first single from the album, written by Seymour, reached #22 on the Billboard Hot 100 for the week ending March 28, 1981. It also went to #6 in Australia, where it was certified gold. "I Really Love You" reached #13 in South Africa. The album also included a cover of "Trying to Get to You" as well as Phil's "Baby It's You", included on Poptopia: Powerpop Classics of the 80s, a compilation released in 1997 by Rhino.

His second solo album Phil Seymour 2 was released in 1982 but featured less original material. It included the Tom Petty song "Surrender". Boardwalk Records' founder Neil Bogart died shortly after its release, which collapsed the label (not a new experience for Seymour as Shelter Records had collapsed during the Dwight Twilley Band days), and Seymour was again without a record deal.

In August 1986, Seymour had a ten-hour recording session with Phil Spector but nothing was released and what was recorded if anything is unknown.

== Illness and posthumous releases ==
In 1984, Seymour joined the Textones, a roots rock band led by Carla Olson and George Callins. With them, he recorded the Midnight Mission, and toured with them as a singer and drummer. During the tour, he noticed lumps appearing on his neck, and he was diagnosed with lymphoma. Seymour moved back to Tulsa to undergo treatment for the cancer and continued to record and play live locally, albeit at a much diminished pace, until his death on August 17, 1993, at the Tarzana Medical Center in Los Angeles at the age of 41.

In 1996, after its acquisition of Shelter Records, EMI's The Right Stuff reissue label released Precious to Me, a 15-song Seymour collection, which served as a companion piece to Dwight Twilley's XXI collection on the same label. The album included songs from Seymour's days with The Dwight Twilley Band and the Textones as well as unreleased solo material recorded for Shelter in 1978 and with Olson and Callins in 1991 and 1992. Midnight Mission was reissued in 2001, and in 2005, Phil Seymour was reissued on CD with three bonus tracks, one each composed by Seymour, Twilley and Pitcock. Phil Seymour 2 was released by Fuel 2000 Records (Universal) in October 2011 with 10 previously unreleased bonus tracks.

On April 24, 2020, Sunset Blvd. Records released "If You Don't Want My Love". The album features previously unreleased recordings including the title track, written by Phil Spector and John Prine.

== Discography ==
=== The Dwight Twilley Band ===
- Sincerely (1976, reissued 1989, 1997, 2007)
- Twilley Don't Mind (1977, reissued 1990, 1997, 2007)
- The Great Lost Twilley Album (1993)
- Live from Agora (2026)

=== Solo ===
- Phil Seymour (1981, reissued 2005, 2012), US #64
- Phil Seymour 2 (1982, reissued 2011)
- Precious to Me (1996)
- Phil Seymour in Concert! Live at the Hong Kong Cafe, 1979 & Live at Gazzarri's, 1980 (2014)
- London & Los Angeles Unreleased Sessions (2016)
- Prince of Power Pop - His Very Best (2017)
- If You Don’t Want My Love (2020)

=== Textones ===
- Midnight Mission (1984, reissued 2001)
- Detroit '85 Live & Unreleased (2008, first release, Collectors' Choice Music)
