= A Little Bit of Love =

A Little Bit of Love may refer to:

- A Little Bit of Love (album), by Paul Williams, 1974
- "A Little Bit of Love" (Andreas Johnson song), 2007
- "A Little Bit of Love" (RuPaul song), 1997
- "A Little Bit of Love" (Weezer song), 2022
- "Little Bit of Love" (Free song), 1972
- "Little Bit of Love" (Kesha song), 2020
- "Little Bit of Love" (Tom Grennan song), 2021
- "A Little Bit of Love", a 1979 song by Brenda Russell from her self-titled debut studio album Brenda Russell
- "Little Bit of Love", a 1984 single by Dwight Twilley from his solo album Jungle
- "Little Bit of Love", a 1992 song by Celine Dion from Celine Dion
- "Little Bit of Love", a 2019 song by Tritonal featuring Rachel Platten

== See also ==
- "Just a Little Bit of Love", a 1997 song by Celine Dion from Let's Talk About Love
