= I'm on Fire (Dwight Twilley Band song) =

Single by Dwight Twilley Band

from the album Sincerely
- B-side: "Did You See What Happened?"
- Released: April 1975
- Studio: The Church Studio, Tulsa
- Genre: • Power pop; glam rock • roots rock
- Length: 3:09
- Label: Shelter
- Songwriter: Dwight Twilley
- Producer: Oister

Dwight Twilley Band singles chronology
"I'm on Fire" (1975)	"You Were So Warm" (1975)

"I'm on Fire" is the debut single by the Dwight Twilley Band, released in April 1975. The song was later included on the band's first album, Sincerely, released in July 1976.

== Background ==
The single has a unique mix, with added reverb and vocal overdubs compared to the LP version. This mix can be found on the Rhino CD compilation Have a Nice Day, Vol. 15, released in 1990.

== Chart performance ==
The single peaked at number 16 on the Billboard Hot 100, in August 1975, and number 57 in Canada.
