= Electro-Voice (album) =

Electro Voice

Studio album by Dan Peek
- Released: 1986
- Genre: Contemporary Christian music, soft rock
- Label: Greentree
- Producer: Dan Peek

Dan Peek chronology
Doer of the Word (1984)	Electro Voice (1986)	Cross Over (1987)

Electro Voice is the third solo album by former America member Dan Peek, released in 1986.

The first single from the album was a remake of Peek's 1975 hit with America, "Lonely People". The song reached No. 2 on the contemporary Christian music chart and No. 1 on the Christian Adult chart for four weeks. The title track made the CCM Top 10 and "A New Song" also charted on the CCM Adult chart.

== Track listing ==
All songs written by Dan Peek, except where noted.

1. "Electro-Voice"
2. "A New Song"
3. "Solid Ground" (Joe Fair, Dan Moran)
4. "Not My Will"
5. "Lonely People" (Dan & Catherine Peek)
6. "His Master's Voice"
7. "I'll Be Coming Home"
8. "Open Up Your Heart"
9. "The Rapture"
10. "All Things Work Together for Good"
