= Sincerely (Dwight Twilley Band album) =

1976 album by the Dwight Twilley Band

Studio album by Dwight Twilley Band
- Released: July 1976
- Recorded: 1974–1976
- Genres: Rock, power pop
- Length: 43:31
- Label: Shelter
- Producers: Dwight Twilley, Phil Seymour

Dwight Twilley Band chronology
Sincerely (1976)	Twilley Don't Mind (1977)

Professional ratings
Review scores
Source	Rating
AllMusic	5/5 stars
Christgau's Record Guide	B+

Sincerely is the debut album from the Dwight Twilley Band, released in 1976 on Shelter Records. The band consisted solely of Dwight Twilley (guitar, piano, lead and harmony vocals) and Phil Seymour (drums, bass, percussion, lead and harmony vocals), although touring band member Bill Pitcock IV played lead guitar on every song except for "Sincerely" itself. The album credited production to Oister, which was the original name of the Dwight Twilley Band; later reissues have credited production directly to Twilley and Seymour.

== Background ==
The songs on Sincerely come from three distinct recording periods: the band's first Tulsa and Los Angeles sessions for Shelter Records in 1974, which were intended by the label as rehearsals and demos but produced both of the first two singles (the top 20 hit "I'm on Fire" and "You Were So Warm"), a recording session produced by Robin Cable at Trident Studios in London that produced an entire album of material (tentatively called Fire), and the band's sessions in Tulsa after returning from London.

Due to the split between Leon Russell and Denny Cordell, Shelter Records lost its distribution deal in 1975 and was essentially out of business for a year. Had Fire been released as planned in late 1975, the track list supposedly included the following thirteen songs, with five songs produced by Oister (#) and eight by Cable (+): "I'm On Fire"#, "England"+, "Look Like An Angel"+, "I Don't Know My Name"+, "Lovin' Me"#, "Rock Yourself, Son"+, "Sky Blue"+, "Shark (In The Dark)"#, "Miserable Lady"+, "You Were So Warm"#, "No Resistance"+, "Dancer"+ and "Please Say Please"#.

Because Shelter had no deal to release anything at the time, though, Fire was never released, and the final album was substantially altered, as the Twilley Band had recorded and produced at least another album's worth of material in the intervening year. Ultimately, only one of the Robin Cable-produced songs ("England") and three of the songs from Fire (also "I'm On Fire" and "You Were So Warm") reached the original version of Sincerely.

== Release ==
The extensive delay in release of the album after "I'm on Fire" contributed to Sincerely's lack of sales success. It topped out at #138 on the Billboard album charts—even though the album used the same cover photograph as the front of the "I'm On Fire" single (a photograph of Twilley taken in a photo booth) to play up the connection. All but one of the songs from Fire (and the other unreleased Twilley tracks from that period, some of which were intended for The B Album—at one time viewed as the follow-up to Fire) have ended up either as bonus tracks on later editions of Sincerely or on The Great Lost Twilley Album, a compilation of unreleased Dwight Twilley Band tracks that was issued on DCC Compact Classics (through Shelter) in 1993. The only song that has never been released in any form is the Cable-produced version of "Sky Blue"; although Twilley has written that the Dwight Twilley Band recorded that song more times than any other and that it was the first Twilley Band song to be played on the radio, the only version of it to be released is a Twilley solo version.

Because of the shifting distributions of Shelter Records until it was acquired by EMI in 1993, Sincerely went out of print on LP within a couple of years after release. It has been reissued on CD three times: by DCC Compact Classics in 1989, by The Right Stuff imprint of EMI in 1997 and by Australia's Raven Records in 2007, as part of a two-pack with the second Dwight Twilley Band album, Twilley Don't Mind. Both of the first two reissues of Sincerely contain a bonus track that is not available elsewhere: "Look Like An Angel" on the 1989 DCC Classics reissue, and "Tiger Eyes" on the 1997 The Right Stuff/EMI reissue. However, all of the bonus songs on the 2007 Raven Records reissue were previously released on The Great Lost Twilley Album.

== Track listing ==
All tracks written by Dwight Twilley.

1. "I'm on Fire" – 3:15
2. "Could Be Love" – 2:38
3. "Feeling in the Dark" – 2:54
4. "You Were So Warm" – 2:25
5. "I'm Losing You" – 2:11
6. "Sincerely" – 2:38
7. "TV" – 2:23
8. "Release Me" – 2:28
9. "Three Persons" – 2:05
10. "Baby Let's Cruise" – 3:00
11. "England" – 2:33
12. "Just Like the Sun" – 3:46

1989 bonus tracks

1. "Did You See What Happened?" – 3:15
2. "Look Like an Angel" – 4:42
3. "Miserable Lady" – 2:56
4. "Rock Yourself, Son" – 2:27

1997 bonus tracks

1. "Tiger Eyes" – 2:36
2. "Please Say Please" – 2:23
3. "Miserable Lady" – 3:03
4. "Rock Yourself, Son" – 2:28

2007 bonus tracks

1. "I Don't Know My Name" – 2:18
2. "Shark (In the Dark)" – 2:32
3. "Didn't You Say" – 3:01
4. "You Never Listen to My Music" – 3:18

== Personnel ==
=== Producers ===
- Dwight Twilley and Phil Seymour (also known as "Oister")

except – "TV" produced by Twilley, Seymour and Bob Schaper;
"England", "Look Like an Angel", "Miserable Lady", "Rock Yourself, Son" and "I Don't Know My Name" produced by Robin Cable;
"Shark (In The Dark)" produced by Twilley, Seymour and "The Master of Time and Space" (Leon Russell).

- Engineers – Jim Barth, Roger Harris, Roger Linn, Robin Cable, Ted Sharp, Bob Schaper, John Harkin

=== Musicians ===
- Dwight Twilley – lead and harmony vocals, guitar, keyboards, harmonica on "Baby Let's Cruise"
- Phil Seymour – lead and harmony vocals, drums, percussion, bass
- Bill Pitcock IV – lead guitar
- Roger Linn – lead guitar and bass on "Sincerely"
- Jerry Naifeh – drums on "TV"
- Johnny Johnson – bass on "I'm Losing You", "TV", "Three Persons", "Baby Let's Cruise", "Please Say Please" and "Didn't You Say"
- Leon Russell – piano and bass on "Feeling In The Dark" and "Shark (In The Dark)"
