= Twilley (album) =

Studio album by Dwight Twilley
- Released: 1979
- Genre: Rock, power pop
- Length: 32:17
- Label: Arista Records
- Producer: Dwight Twilley, Max, Noah Shark

Dwight Twilley chronology
Twilley (1979)	Scuba Divers (1982)

Professional ratings
Review scores
Source	Rating
AllMusic	4.5/5 stars
Christgau's Record Guide	C+

Twilley is the debut solo album by power pop musician Dwight Twilley. He recorded it after the Dwight Twilley Band disbanded.

== Track listing ==
All songs written by Dwight Twilley.

Side one
No.	Title	Length
1.	"Out of My Hands"	5:26
2.	"Nothing's Ever Gonna Change So Fast"	3:30
3.	"Runaway"	3:12
4.	"Standin' in the Shadow of Love"	2:51
5.	"Alone in My Room"	2:36

Side two
No.	Title	Length
6.	"Betsy Sue"	2:17
7.	"Darlin"	3:11
8.	"I Wanna Make Love to You"	3:32
9.	"Got You Where I Want You"	2:36
10.	"It Takes a Lot of Love"	3:05

== Personnel ==
- Dwight Twilley – vocals, guitar, piano, harmonica, percussion
- Phil Seymour – backing vocals (7)
- Jim Lewis – bass, drums
- Jerry Naifeh – drums (3 and 10)
- Noah Shark – percussion
- Bill Pitcock IV – lead guitar
- Jimmy Haskell – strings
- Greg Block – violin (3)

=== Production personnel ===
- Dwight Twilley – producer
- Noah Shark – engineer, producer
- Max Reese – producer
- Jim Lewis – engineer
- Hartmann & Goodman – management
- Zox – Cover art
