= Homecoming (America album) =

Studio album by America
- Released: November 15, 1972
- Recorded: 1972
- Studios: The Record Plant, Los Angeles
- Genres: Folk rock, soft rock
- Length: 33:06
- Label: Warner Bros.
- Producer: America

America chronology
America (1972)	Homecoming (1972)	Hat Trick (1973)

Singles from Homecoming
- 1. "Ventura Highway" Released: October 1972; 2. "Don't Cross the River" Released: January 1973; 3. "Only in Your Heart" Released: April 1973

Homecoming is the second studio album by America, released on November 15, 1972, through Warner Bros. Records. Acoustic guitar-based, with a more pronounced electric guitar and keyboard section than their first album, their second effort helped continue the band's success, and includes one of their best known hits, "Ventura Highway".

Homecoming peaked at number 9 on Billboard's Pop Albums Chart and was certified platinum by the RIAA. It produced three hit singles: "Ventura Highway", which peaked at number 8 on the Billboard singles chart and number 3 on the adult contemporary chart; "Don't Cross the River", which hit number 35 on Billboard and 23 on the AC chart; and "Only in Your Heart" peaked at number 62 on Billboard's Pop singles chart. Several other songs received radio airplay on FM stations playing album tracks, including "To Each His Own", "California Revisited", and "Cornwall Blank".

For this album and the next six throughout the next five years, the group traditionally chose titles beginning with the letter "H" (the self-titled debut album became unofficially included in this distinction when fans started referring to it as the "Horse with No Name" album when that track was added to later pressings).

== Reception ==
Professional ratings
Review scores
Source	Rating
AllMusic	4/5 stars
The Rolling Stone Album Guide	2/5 stars

In his AllMusic review, music critic David Cleary called Homecoming "America's finest album" and despite citing sometimes banal lyrics, wrote that "each song here has something to recommend it. This top-flight album is a very rewarding listen."

Record World said of "Don't Cross the River" that it was a "more countrified cut [than 'Ventura Highway'] complete with banjos and all."

== Track listing ==
No.	Title	Writer(s)	Length
1.	"Ventura Highway"	Dewey Bunnell	3:32
2.	"To Each His Own"	Gerry Beckley	3:13
3.	"Don't Cross the River"	Dan Peek	2:30
4.	"Moon Song"	Bunnell	3:41
5.	"Only in Your Heart"	Beckley	3:16
6.	"Till the Sun Comes Up Again"	Beckley	2:12
7.	"Cornwall Blank"	Bunnell	4:19
8.	"Head and Heart"	John Martyn	3:49
9.	"California Revisited"	Peek	3:03
10.	"Saturn Nights"	Peek	3:31

== Personnel ==
America

- Dan Peek – guitar, keyboards, vocals
- Gerry Beckley – guitar, keyboards, vocals, bass guitar on "Till the Sun Comes Up Again" and "Head and Heart"
- Dewey Bunnell – guitar, vocals, percussion on "Head & Heart"

with:

- Joe Osborn – bass guitar
- Hal Blaine – drums, percussion
- Gary Mallaber – drums and percussion on "Till the Sun Comes Up Again"

Technical

- Gary Burden – art direction, design
- Henry Diltz – photography, banjo on "Don't Cross the River"
- Bill Halverson – engineer
- Lee Herschberg – mastering
- Chuck Leary – engineering assistance
- Mike D. Stone of the Record Plant – engineering
- Yoshiro Nagato – liner notes

== Charts ==
=== Weekly charts ===
Chart (1972–1973)	Peak position
Australian Albums (Kent Music Report)	17
Canada Top Albums/CDs (RPM)	6
Japanese Albums (Oricon)	42
Spain (AFYVE)	17
UK Albums (Official Charts)	21
US Billboard 200	3

=== Year-end charts ===
Chart (1973)	Position
US Billboard 200	40

== Certifications ==
Region	Certification	Certified units/sales
Australia (ARIA)	Gold	35,000^{^}
Canada (Music Canada)	Gold	50,000^{^}
United States (RIAA)	Platinum	1,000,000^{^}
^{^} Shipments figures based on certification alone.
