= Twilley Don't Mind =

Studio album by Dwight Twilley Band
- Released: September 7, 1977
- Recorded: 1977
- Genre: Rock; power pop
- Label: Shelter
- Producer: Dwight Twilley; Phil Seymour; Bob Schaper

Dwight Twilley Band chronology
Sincerely (1976)	Twilley Don't Mind (1977)	The Great Lost Twilley Album (1993)

Alternate album cover

Professional ratings
Review scores
Source	Rating
AllMusic	4/5 stars
Christgau's Record Guide	B
The Village Voice	B+

Twilley Don't Mind is the second album from the Dwight Twilley Band, recorded and released in 1977 on Shelter Records, distributed at the time by Arista Records. The band consisted of Dwight Twilley (guitar, piano, lead and harmony vocals), Phil Seymour (drums, bass, percussion, lead and harmony vocals), and Bill Pitcock IV (lead guitar, bass). The original album credited production to Oister, which was the original name of the Dwight Twilley Band, and Bob Schaper; later reissues have credited production directly to Twilley, Seymour and Schaper.

== Background ==
After the critical success (albeit commercial failure) of the Dwight Twilley Band's first album, Sincerely, hopes ran high for the second album. To capitalize on those hopes, Shelter Records reached a new distribution deal with Arista Records for the second album, which, unlike the first album, was demoed in advance. The band knew exactly which 10 songs that it wanted to record, and those were the only songs recorded in the final session. When the band experienced difficulty during its final production work on "Fallin' In Love", the album was released with only nine songs. The original cover was vetoed by Arista label head Clive Davis, who then chose the replacement cover that was ultimately used.

Unfortunately, once again the Dwight Twilley Band was praised by the critics but failed to find success with the record buying public. Twilley Don't Mind peaked at #70 on the Billboard 200 album chart. The failure of the album proved particularly frustrating to Phil Seymour, especially when coupled with the success of their friend and label mate Tom Petty, on whose album Seymour and Twilley had appeared as harmony and backing vocalists. Ultimately, in early 1978, the Dwight Twilley Band broke up as a result.

Because of the shifting distributions of Shelter Records until it was acquired by EMI in 1993, Twilley Don't Mind went out of print on LP within a few years after release. It has been reissued on CD three times: by DCC Compact Classics in 1990, by The Right Stuff imprint of EMI in 1997 and by Australia's Raven Records in 2007, as part of a two-pack with the first Dwight Twilley Band album, Sincerely. Both of the first two reissues of Twilley Don't Mind contain the final version of "Fallin' In Love" as a bonus track, but the Raven "twofer" has no bonus tracks associated with this album. The Right Stuff reissue uses the alternative cover, which was the originally-planned cover.

The track "Looking for the Magic" was featured prominently in the 2011 horror film You're Next and the 2015 coming-of-age drama The Diary of a Teenage Girl.

== Track listing ==
All songs written by Dwight Twilley.

1. "Twilley Don't Mind" - 2:48
2. "Looking For The Magic" - 3:10
3. "That I Remember" - 3:22
4. "Rock & Roll 47" - 3:10
5. "Trying To Find My Baby" - 3:22
6. "Here She Comes" - 4:02
7. "Sleeping" - 6:06
8. "Chance To Get Away' - 2:32
9. "Invasion" - 3:22

1990 bonus track

10. "Fallin' In Love" - 4:10

1997 bonus tracks

10. "Fallin' In Love"
11. "Invasion" (Noah Shark mix)
12. "Rock & Roll 47" (Noah Shark mix)
13. "Twilley Don't Mind" (Noah Shark mix)

== Personnel ==
=== Producers ===
- Dwight Twilley and Phil Seymour (also known as "Oister") and Bob Schaper.
- Engineer: Bob Schaper
- Additional recording: Jim Barth
- Remix of "That I Remember": Val Garay

=== Musicians ===
- Dwight Twilley: lead and harmony vocals, guitar, piano
- Phil Seymour: lead and harmony vocals, drums, bass
- Bill Pitcock IV: lead guitar, bass on "Twilley Don't Mind" and "Looking For The Magic"
- Tom Petty: guitar on "Looking For The Magic"
- Johnny Johnson: bass on "Chance To Get Away"
- Patrick Henderson: piano on "Invasion"
- James Newton Howard: strings on "Sleeping"
- Tom Saviano: horns on "Twilley Don't Mind" and "Rock & Roll 47"
