= Hat Trick (America album) =

Studio album by America
- Released: October 26, 1973
- Recorded: 29 May – 12 July 1973
- Studios: The Record Plant, Los Angeles
- Genres: Country rock, folk rock, soft rock
- Length: 41:39
- Label: Warner Bros.
- Producers: Gerry Beckley; Dewey Bunnell; Dan Peek

America chronology
Homecoming (1972)	Hat Trick (1973)	Holiday (1974)

Singles from Hat Trick
- 1. "Muskrat Love" Released: August 1973; 2. "Rainbow Song" Released: November 1973; 3. "Green Monkey" Released: February 1974

Hat Trick is the third studio album by the American folk rock trio America, released on Warner Bros. Records in 1973. It peaked at number 28 on the Billboard album chart; it failed to go gold, whereas the group's first two releases had platinum sales. The album produced the single "Muskrat Love", which reached number 67 on the Billboard singles chart and number 11 on the adult contemporary chart. That song would become a much bigger hit for Captain & Tennille three years later.

== Production ==
Hat Trick marks the first instance of string arrangements being used on an America album, completed with the assistance of Jim Ed Norman.

== Reception ==
Professional ratings
Review scores
Source	Rating
AllMusic	2/5 stars
The Encyclopedia of Popular Music	2/5 stars
MusicHound Rock: The Essential Album Guide	2/5 stars
The Rolling Stone Album Guide	1/5 stars

In his AllMusic review, Mike DeGagne wrote that the album faltered "mainly because the songs lacked the cordial folk-rock melodies and mindful songwriting that prevailed on the earlier releases. "She's Gonna Let You Down" and "Rainbow Song" are the album's best cuts, but banal offerings such as "Green Monkey", "Willow Tree Lullaby", and "Molten Love" have Bunnell and Peek straying off course, sounding stale and musically feeble." The Rough Guide to Rock called Hat Trick "one of country-rock's great lost albums." The Rolling Stone Album Guide deemed "Muskrat Love" "an early nadir in cuteness."

== Track listing ==
No.	Title	Writer(s)	Length
1.	"Muskrat Love"	Willis Alan Ramsey	3:06
2.	"Wind Wave"	Dewey Bunnell	2:55
3.	"She's Gonna Let You Down"	Gerry Beckley	3:41
4.	"Rainbow Song"	Bunnell	3:53
5.	"Submarine Ladies"	Beckley	3:13
6.	"It's Life"	Dan Peek	4:00
7.	"Hat Trick"	Beckley, Bunnell, Peek	8:29
8.	"Molten Love"	Bunnell	3:10
9.	"Green Monkey"	Bunnell	3:38
10.	"Willow Tree Lullaby"	Peek	2:34
11.	"Goodbye"	Beckley	3:10

== Personnel ==
=== Performance ===
America

- Gerry Beckley – guitars, keyboards, lead and backing vocals
- Dewey Bunnell – guitars, lead and backing vocals
- Dan Peek – guitars, keyboards, lead and backing vocals

with:

- David Dickey – bass guitar
- Hal Blaine – drums, percussion (except "Muskrat Love")
- Henry Diltz – banjo ("Submarine Ladies")
- Billy Hinsche – backing vocals ("Hat Trick")
- Bruce Johnston – backing vocals ("Hat Trick")
- Lee Keifer – harmonica ("Submarine Ladies")
- Robert Margouleff – synthesizer
- Chester McCracken – congas
- Jim Ed Norman – arrangements, piano ("She's Gonna Let You Down")
- Tom Scott – saxophone ("Rainbow Song")
- Joe Walsh – guitar ("Green Monkey")
- Carl Wilson – backing vocals ("Hat Trick")
- Lorene Yarnell – taps ("Hat Trick")

=== Production ===
- Gerry Beckley – production
- Dewey Bunnell – production
- Gary Burden – art direction
- Henry Diltz – photography
- Lee Keifer – assistant engineer
- Dan Peek – production
- Mike D. Stone – Record Plant engineer

== Charts ==
Chart (1973–1974)	Peak position
Australian Albums (Kent Music Report)	24
Canada Top Albums/CDs (RPM)	45
Spain (AFYVE)	24
UK Albums (Official Charts)	41
US Billboard 200	28

== Certifications ==
Region	Certification	Certified units/sales
United Kingdom (BPI)	Silver	60,000^{^}
^{^} Shipments figures based on certification alone.
