= Hearts (America album) =

Studio album by America
- Released: March 19, 1975
- Recorded: January 6–30, 1975
- Studios: The Record Plant, Sausalito, California
- Genres: Folk rock; pop rock; soft rock
- Length: 36:31
- Label: Warner Bros.
- Producer: George Martin

America chronology
Holiday (1974)	Hearts (1975)	History: America's Greatest Hits (1975)

Singles from Hearts
- 1. "Sister Golden Hair" Released: March 19, 1975; 2. "Daisy Jane" Released: July 2, 1975; 3. "Woman Tonight" Released: August 29, 1975 (UK)

Professional ratings
Review scores
Source	Rating
The Rolling Stone Album Guide	2/5 stars

Hearts is the fifth studio album by American folk rock trio America, released by Warner Bros. Records in 1975. The album was produced by George Martin, the second of six consecutive studio albums he produced for America.

This album was a big hit in the US, reaching number 4 on the Billboard album chart and being certified gold by the RIAA. It produced three hit singles: "Sister Golden Hair", which went to number 1 on the Billboard singles chart and number 5 on the adult contemporary chart; "Daisy Jane", which peaked at 20 on the Billboard singles chart and number 4 on the Adult Contemporary chart; and the funky "Woman Tonight", which reached 44 on the Billboard singles chart and 41 on the Adult Contemporary chart. Several other songs received radio airplay on FM stations playing album tracks including "Company", "Old Virginia", "Bell Tree" and "Midnight". The album was also released on Quadrophonic reel-to-reel tape for 4-channel enthusiasts, also released on Quadraphonic CD-4 album.

The cover was designed by Phil Hartman, who eventually left graphic design to pursue acting.

Cash Box said of the single "Woman Tonight" that "instead of the expected [ballad], the boys dash off some good new-fashioned change." Record World said that rather than "America's soft, willowy sound," "Woman Tonight" is a "hearty rockin' romp with a reggae flavor."

== Track listing ==
No.	Title	Writer(s)	Length
1.	"Daisy Jane"	Gerry Beckley	3:07
2.	"Half a Man"	Dan Peek	3:33
3.	"Midnight"	Beckley, Dewey Bunnell	2:41
4.	"Bell Tree"	Beckley	2:32
5.	"Old Virginia"	D. Peek, Catherine Peek	3:28
6.	"People in the Valley"	Bunnell	2:43
7.	"Company"	Bunnell	3:23
8.	"Woman Tonight"	D. Peek	2:19
9.	"The Story of a Teenager"	Beckley, D. Peek	3:19
10.	"Sister Golden Hair"	Beckley	3:16
11.	"Tomorrow"	D. Peek	2:48
12.	"Seasons"	Bunnell	3:00
13.	"Simple Life" (bonus track on Japanese CD)	D. Peek	2:12

== Personnel ==
America

- Gerry Beckley – vocals, guitar, keyboards
- Dewey Bunnell – vocals, guitar
- Dan Peek – vocals, guitar, keyboards

with:

- David Dickey – bass
- Willie Leacox – drums, percussion
- George Martin – keyboards
- Uncredited – cello (on "Daisy Jane")
- Clydie King, Venetta Fields – background vocals "Story of a Teenager"

Production

- George Martin – producer, arranger
- Geoff Emerick – engineer
- Mark Guercio – assistant engineer
- Henry Diltz – photography at Golden Gate Bridge, San Francisco, California
- Phil Hartman – art direction, design

== Charts ==
=== Weekly charts ===
Chart (1975)	Peak position
Australian Albums (Kent Music Report)	17
Canada Top Albums/CDs (RPM)	3
Japanese Albums (Oricon)	74
New Zealand Albums (RMNZ)	12
US Billboard 200	4

=== Year-end charts ===
Chart (1975)	Position
Canada Top Albums/CDs (RPM)	21
US Billboard 200	21

== Certifications ==
Region	Certification	Certified units/sales
Canada (Music Canada)	Gold	50,000^{^}
United Kingdom (BPI)	Silver	60,000^{^}
United States (RIAA)	Gold	500,000^{^}
^{^} Shipments figures based on certification alone.
