= Willis Alan Ramsey (album) =

Studio album by Willis Alan Ramsey
- Released: May 1972
- Recorded: 1972
- Studio: Beautiful Sounds, Memphis, Tennessee; Skyhill Studios, Hollywood Hills; Robin Hill Studios, Tyler, Texas, Sunset Sound, Hollywood; Quadraphonic Sound Studios, Nashville, Tennessee
- Genre: Country: Progressive country; folk
- Length: 39:07
- Label: Shelter
- Producer: Denny Cordell, Willis Alan Ramsey

Professional ratings
Review scores
Source	Rating
Allmusic	4.5/5 stars

Willis Alan Ramsey is the sole studio release by the Texas songwriter Willis Alan Ramsey. The album's genre is hard to categorize with touches of country, country rock, folk, and folk rock. The tunes range from the reflection and regret of "The Ballad of Spider John" to a heartfelt tribute to Woody Guthrie on "Boy from Oklahoma". It was recorded on Leon Russell's Shelter label in 1972, and Russell sat in on piano, keyboards, and vibraphone. Other guest musicians include: Carl Radle, Jim Keltner, Red Rhodes, Leland Sklar, and Russ Kunkel. The song "Muskrat Candlelight" was covered by the band America in 1973 and by Captain & Tennille in 1976, both using the title "Muskrat Love." "The Ballad of Spider John" was covered by Jimmy Buffett on his 1974 album Living & Dying in 3/4 Time. The song "Satin Sheets" (not the Jeanne Pruett song of the same name) was covered by The Bellamy Brothers and Shawn Colvin. The album was mixed by Al Schmitt.

== Track listing ==
All tracks are written by Willis Alan Ramsey.

No.	Title	Length
1.	"Ballad of Spider John"	4:16
2.	"Muskrat Candlelight"	3:18
3.	"Geraldine and the Honeybee"	2:15
4.	"Wishbone"	2:42
5.	"Satin Sheets"	2:32
6.	"Goodbye Old Missoula"	4:53
7.	"Painted Lady"	3:02
8.	"Watermelon Man"	3:25
9.	"Boy from Oklahoma"	3:54
10.	"Angel Eyes"	3:07
11.	"Northeast Texas Women"	5:43
Total length:		39:07

== Personnel ==
- Willis Alan Ramsey - guitar, bass, harmonica, vocals
- Leon Russell - piano, keyboards, vibraphone, vocals
- Robert Aberg - guitar (acoustic, electric, & slide)
- Red Rhodes - pedal steel guitar
- Dusty Rhodes - fiddle, violin
- Carl Radle - bass
- Jim Keltner - drums
- Russ Kunkel - drums
- Eddie Hinton - guitar
- Nick DeCaro - accordion, string arrangements
- Charles Perrino - guitar, vocals
- Ernie Watts - saxophone
- Kenneth Buttrey - drums
- Waller Collie - drums, vocals
- Tim Drummond - bass
- John Harris - piano
- Cathy Pruitt - cello
- Tim Self - fiddle, violin
- Larry Stedman - piano
- Leland Sklar - bass
- Kenny Bulbey - drums
- Mike Sexton - vocals
- David Ward II - bells, cowbell, sound effects
- Grant Conch - sound effects
- Terry Dodson - sound effects

Technical

- Richard Rosebrough - audio engineer
- Terry Manning - audio engineer
- Al Schmitt - mix engineer
- Denny Cordell - producer
- Bob Potter, Peter Nichols - recording engineer
- Marlene Bergman - art direction
- William Matthews - photography, artwork
- Ellis Widner - liner notes

"Extra help from Ron Burnham, Austin, Texas. Special thanks to Leon Russell, J.J. Cale and Elliot Mazer. Also to Gregory Allman for his encouragement",
