= Muskrat Love =

1972 song by Willis Alan Ramsey

"Muskrat Candlelight"

Song by Willis Alan Ramsey

from the album Willis Alan Ramsey
- Released: May 1972
- Recorded: 1972
- Genre: Soft rock
- Length: 3:18
- Label: Shelter
- Songwriter: Willis Alan Ramsey
- Producers: Denny Cordell, Willis Alan Ramsey

Audio video
- "Muskrat Love (Muskrat Candlelight)" on YouTube

"Muskrat Love" is a soft rock song written by Willis Alan Ramsey. The song depicts a romantic liaison between two anthropomorphic muskrats named Susie and Sam. It was first recorded in 1972 by Ramsey for his sole album release Willis Alan Ramsey. The song was originally titled "Muskrat Candlelight" referencing the song's opening lyric.

A 1973 cover version by the folk/rock band America—retitled "Muskrat Love" for the lyrics that close the chorus—was a minor hit, reaching number 67 on the Billboard Hot 100 chart. In 1976, a cover by pop music duo Captain & Tennille resulted in the song's highest profile, peaking at number four on the Hot 100 chart. It also reached number two on the Cash Box chart, which ranked it as the 30th biggest hit of 1976.

== America version ==
"Muskrat Love"

Single by America

from the album Hat Trick
- B-side: "Cornwall Blank"
- Released: August 1973
- Recorded: 1973
- Studio: Record Plant, Los Angeles
- Genre: Folk rock
- Length: 3:06
- Label: Warner Bros.
- Songwriter: Willis Alan Ramsey
- Producers: Gerry Beckley, Dewey Bunnell, Dan Peek

America singles chronology
| "Only in Your Heart" (1973) | "Muskrat Love" (1973) | "Rainbow Song" (1973) |

Official Audio
- "Muskrat Love" on YouTube

=== Background ===
America recorded "Muskrat Love" for their 1973 album Hat Trick, marking the second time America had recorded a song not written by a band member. In putting together ten songs to compose the eventual Hat Trick album, band members Gerry Beckley, Dewey Bunnell, and Dan Peek had agreed to each contribute three compositions, with a mutually agreeable cover song being recorded as the 10th track. David Dickey, who played bass for the band, brought Ramsey's "Muskrat Candlelight" to the group's attention; according to Beckley, "to us it sounded like a very bluesy, quirky tune. We just felt it was quirky and commercial, and we worked it up."

=== Release and reception ===
"Muskrat Love" was issued as an advance single from Hat Trick in early August 1973, although Dan Peek would recall that America's label Warner Bros. "hated" the track and "begged us not to release it as a single...We were stupid to press the issue, but we liked the song for its easy, acoustic, harmonic beauty, not realizing that perhaps it was badly cast for us to retain the fairly hip image we had eked out". Peek adds that the single "easily hit the Top 40 on the strength of our past successes" although "Muskrat Love" in fact marked a downturn in America's popularity with a low peak on the Billboard Hot 100 at number 67; the single did better on Cash Box, reaching 33, and the Billboard adult contemporary, chart reaching number 11.

In a 2012 interview, Gerry Beckley said of "Muskrat Love": "It's a polarizing little number. After concerts, some people tell us they can't believe we didn't play it, while others go out of their way to thank us for not performing it."

=== Track listings ===
1. "Muskrat Love" – 3:06
2. "Cornwall Blank" – 4:19

=== Chart performance ===
| Chart (1973) | Peak position |
|---|---|
| Canada RPM Top Singles | 68 |
| Canada RPM Adult Contemporary | 30 |
| US Billboard Easy Listening | 11 |
| US Billboard Hot 100 | 67 |
| US Cash Box Top 100 | 33 |
| US Record World | 69 |

== Captain & Tennille version ==
"Muskrat Love"

Single by Captain & Tennille

from the album Song of Joy
- B-side: "Honey Come Love Me"
- Released: September 1976
- Genre: Soft rock
- Length: 3:48
- Label: A&M
- Songwriter: Willis Alan Ramsey
- Producer: Captain & Tennille

Captain & Tennille singles chronology
| "Shop Around" (1976) | "Muskrat Love" (1976) | "Can't Stop Dancin'" (1977) |

Official Audio
- "Muskrat Love" on YouTube

=== Background ===
Captain & Tennille recorded "Muskrat Love" for their 1976 album release Song of Joy. According to Toni Tennille, who formed Captain & Tennille with her husband Daryl Dragon, the duo had added the song to their nightclub set list a few years earlier after hearing the America single on their car radio: "I said to Daryl: 'Did you hear that? I swear they're singing about muskrats.' I had to know what the lyrics were so the next day we went out and found the sheet music. I said to Daryl: 'This song is hysterical; why don’t we add it to our club-act?' And [the audience] went nuts for it." Being short one track for Song of Joy, Captain & Tennille made an impromptu decision to record "Muskrat Love", including the synthesizer generated sound effects that Dragon had created for the song's performance in their nightclub act, these sound effects meant to evoke the imagined sound of muskrats mating: the eventual 7-inch single version of Captain & Tennille's "Muskrat Love" would feature an "endless loop" of these sound effects created by having the song's end run into the locked groove of the 45.

Despite Captain & Tennille's stated disinterest in highlighting "Muskrat Love" as an item in their repertoire, it was the song they chose to sing at a July 1976 White House dinner honoring Queen Elizabeth II: the press subsequently ran a statement from a dinner guest who opined it was "in very poor taste" to sing of mating muskrats before the Queen. Toni Tennille responded to this charge, saying, "Only a person with a dirty mind would see something wrong. It's a gentle Disneyesque kind of song."

=== Release and reception ===
Purportedly there were no plans to issue a third single off Song of Joy following the Top Ten success of "Lonely Night (Angel Face)" and "Shop Around"; however, A&M Records decided to issue "Muskrat Love" as a single after WISM, a Madison, Wisconsin radio station that had been airing the album cut, reported phenomenal listener response to the song in September 1976. Captain & Tennille's "Muskrat Love" reached a number 4 Hot 100 peak that December and number 2 on Cash Box. It became their biggest Easy Listening chart hit, spending four non-consecutive weeks at number 1. It also reached number one on the Canadian pop singles chart. It did not chart outside North America except in Australia, where it became a minor hit (#65).

Based on the Captain & Tennille version, "Muskrat Love" has become a staple on "worst song" lists, including a 2006 poll by CNN.com. Gerry Beckley of America cited "Muskrat Love" as "a fine example of where the closer you go back to the original seed, the nicer it is. Ours was once removed, and the Captain & Tennille's was even more removed." In a 2001 interview with Reno News & Review, Toni Tennille said of Captain & Tennille's "Muskrat Love": "I don’t know why people are so polarized about this tune. People either love it or they loathe it."

The song was also featured in "The Annotated History of American Muskrat," a 2014 production of the Circuit Theatre Company in Boston, Massachusetts. It appears in the 2013 film Anchorman 2: The Legend Continues.

Starting in 2023, as Elon Musk became the world's richest person and the frequent butt of jokes, Harry Shearer created a "Musk Love" recurring segment to his radio program Le Show. Shearer used the musical break from the Captain & Tennille version for its theme, introduced by clipping the "rat" from the chorus.

=== Track listings ===
1. "Muskrat Love" 3:48
2. "Honey Come Love Me" - 2:57

=== Chart performance ===
==== Weekly charts ====
| Chart (1976–1977) | Peak position |
|---|---|
| US Billboard Hot 100 | 4 |
| US Billboard Adult Contemporary | 1 |
| US Cashbox Top 100 | 2 |
| Canadian RPM Top Singles | 1 |
| Canadian RPM Adult Contemporary | 3 |

==== Year-end charts ====
| Chart (1976) | Rank |
|---|---|
| Canada RPM Top Singles | 40 |

| Chart (1977) | Rank |
|---|---|
| Canada RPM Top Singles | 70 |
| US Billboard Hot 100 | 89 |
| US Cashbox Top 100 | 30 |

=== Certifications ===
Certifications for "Muskrat Love"
| Region | Certification | Certified units/sales |
|---|---|---|
| United States (RIAA) | Gold | 1,000,000^{^} |
^{^} Shipments figures based on certification alone.

== Other versions ==
The first cover version of "Muskrat Candlelight" was an abridged version entitled "Sun Down" recorded by Lani Hall for her 1972 album Sun Down Lady. With composition credit to Willis Alan Ramsey and "additional lyrics" credited to Lani Hall and her husband Herb Alpert, "Sun Down" reformats Ramsey's original tune as a straightforward love song, omitting the anthropomorphic rodent fantasy. It was on A&M Records, which Herb Alpert founded and ran, that "Muskrat Love" with its original lyrics would become a significant hit for Captain & Tennille in 1976.

=== Parodies ===
- A parody version of "Muskrat Love" entitled "Hamster Love" was written and performed by Big Daddy and included on Dr. Demento's 30th Anniversary album.
- Another parody called "Muskrat Gloves" was recorded by comedian Tim Cavanagh.
- The song was performed in the Space Ghost Coast to Coast episode "Sequel" (which featured Captain & Tennille as guests) with added vocals from Space Ghost and Birdman. In the episode, Birdman claimed the song to be him and his wife (Gravity Girl)'s song.
- Three different versions of the song are sung in The Proud Family: Louder and Prouder episode "The Soul Vibrations", where the titular band performs it in three different flashbacks: a funk version, a slow ballad version, and a barbershop quartet version. The ballad version is featured on the soundtrack album for the series.

== See also ==
- List of number-one adult contemporary singles of 1976 (U.S.)
