= Dwight Twilley =

American pop/rock singer and songwriter (1951–2023)

- Born: June 6, 1951; Tulsa, Oklahoma, U.S.
- Died: October 18, 2023 (aged 72) Tulsa, Oklahoma, U.S.
- Genres: Rock, power pop
- Occupations: Singer-songwriter, guitarist, pianist, producer
- Instruments: Vocals, guitar, piano
- Years active: 1974–2023
- Labels: Shelter; Arista; EMI America; Epic; Good Land Records; Big Oak Records
- Website: www.dwighttwilley.com

Dwight Twilley (June 6, 1951 – October 18, 2023) was an American pop/rock singer and songwriter, most notable for the top 20 hit singles "I'm on Fire" (1975) and "Girls" (1984). His music is associated with the power pop style. Twilley and Phil Seymour performed as the Dwight Twilley Band through 1978, and Twilley performed as a solo act afterwards.

His last album, Always, was released in November 2014 through Twilley's own label, Big Oak Records.

== Personal life ==
Twilley was born in Tulsa, Oklahoma, United States. He attended Edison High School and went to Northeastern Oklahoma A&M College from 1971 to 1973.

== The Dwight Twilley Band ==
Twilley and Phil Seymour met in Tulsa in 1967 at a theater where they had gone to see The Beatles' A Hard Day's Night, and soon began writing songs and recording together. They continued their partnership over the next several years under the band name Oister. Twilley wrote all the songs and played guitar and piano, Seymour played drums and bass, and both sang leads and harmonies. Later, guitarist Bill Pitcock IV played lead guitar on most of their tracks.

Twilley and Seymour eventually decided to leave Tulsa and try to be discovered in Memphis, Tennessee. By sheer chance, the first recording studio that they wandered into was Sun Studio, where they met, according to Twilley, "some guy named Phillips." After listening to a cassette of their folk/pop/country blend, Jerry Phillips (son of Sun founder Sam Phillips) referred them to the Tupelo, Mississippi studio of former Sun artist Ray Harris, whom both Twilley and Seymour credited for introducing them to rockabilly and adding a harder edge to their sound.

Ultimately, Twilley and Seymour left Tulsa and went to Los Angeles in 1974 to find a label, where they signed with Shelter Records, a label with offices in Los Angeles and Tulsa that was co-owned by Denny Cordell and Tulsa's Leon Russell. Cordell promptly changed the group's name from Oister to the Dwight Twilley Band, which sowed the seeds for future problems arising from Seymour's anonymity in the partnership. Because of Shelter's Tulsa headquarters, they were able to self-produce many songs in their hometown, recording at The Church Studio. They recorded "I'm on Fire" in one night at the historic studio.

That song became their debut single and reached No. 16 on the Billboard charts in 1975 with relatively little promotion, largely because the band was in England recording its first album, tentatively called Fire, with producer Robin Cable at Trident Studios. The photos used on the single's picture sleeve were low-quality from a photo booth, even less professional than the band's first promotional picture. The unexpected success of the self-produced "I'm On Fire" caused most of the English tracks recorded with Cable to be relegated to a second album, thereafter known as The B Album. Leon Russell then permitted the band to record new tracks at his 40-track home studio, where one of the engineers was Roger Linn, who also contributed lead guitars and bass to some of their recordings.

During an appearance on American Bandstand, the band played what was to be its follow-up single, "Shark (in the Dark)", produced by Twilley, Seymour and Russell. The success of the film Jaws, however, caused Cordell and Shelter to reject the single, apparently to keep the group from being perceived as a cash-in novelty act. The eventual follow-up single, "You Were So Warm" backed with "Sincerely", failed due to distribution problems; just after the single was released, Shelter Records collapsed in the midst of a lawsuit between Russell and Cordell. The Dwight Twilley Band's completed album went unreleased for 10 months due to Shelter's switch from MCA Records to ABC Records for distribution, and The B Album was left unreleased.

When the album Sincerely was finally released in 1976, it failed as well, peaking at No. 138. During this time, Seymour and Twilley befriended labelmate Tom Petty and Phil sang backing vocals on "Breakdown" and "American Girl", creating a long-lasting friendship.

In 1977, the Dwight Twilley Band performed on the short-lived CBS Saturday morning kids show Wacko!.

Shelter then switched distribution again to Arista Records. ABC elected to keep Petty and J. J. Cale, leaving Twilley alone on the Shelter/Arista label. Pitcock became a credited member of the Dwight Twilley Band during touring and recording of the second album. However, that album, Twilley Don't Mind, proved to be another commercial disappointment in 1977. Seymour left the band the following year, pursuing a solo career with some success until he developed what proved to be terminal cancer. He died of lymphoma in 1993, and as of 2007 Twilley still did not perform Dwight Twilley Band songs that featured lead vocals by Seymour.

The Dwight Twilley Band albums were reissued in CD form with bonus tracks by the audiophile DCC Compact Classics label in 1989 and 1990. In 1993, shortly before Phil Seymour's death, the Dwight Twilley Band released The Great Lost Twilley Album, which collected a fraction of the "hundreds" of early unreleased songs Twilley and Seymour had recorded for Shelter, including several songs from The B Album and Blueprint (a Twilley solo album discussed below), as well as a few alternate versions of released songs. However, once again the Dwight Twilley Band fell victim to some label politics, as EMI bought the rights to Shelter just weeks after the release, and all three of the DCC Dwight Twilley Band albums went out of print again.

In 1997, The Right Stuff, a reissue label owned by EMI, reissued Sincerely and Twilley Don't Mind with somewhat different bonus tracks from the DCC versions. They both went out of print the following year, when EMI discontinued the label.

The Dwight Twilley Band albums Sincerely and Twilley Don't Mind were reissued in a two-disk compilations by Australia's Raven Records in 2007 with still different bonus tracks.

Finally, in 2009, a tape of the Dwight Twilley Band's October 1976 concert at the Agora Theatre and Ballroom in Cleveland, Ohio, which had been recorded for broadcast on Cleveland radio station WMMS, was remastered and released as a live album entitled Live From Agora.

== Solo years ==
After the demise of the Dwight Twilley Band, Twilley continued as a solo act, keeping Pitcock on lead guitar and adding Susan Cowsill on harmony vocals. This lineup released the album Twilley for Shelter/Arista in 1979, although the album's most successful song, "Darlin'", featured backing vocals by Seymour. Twilley's next album, Blueprint, co-produced by Jack Nitzsche, was rejected by Arista after the failure of the 1979 single "Somebody to Love" although it was assigned an Arista release number. Blueprint ultimately was never released, keeping Twilley out of circulation until his Shelter contract expired at the end of 1981.

Twilley then moved to EMI America for Scuba Divers (1982), a combination of rejected Blueprint tracks and new material. His follow-up album, Jungle (1984), produced his second national hit single, "Girls", featuring a counterpoint vocal by Petty, which also reached No. 16 on the Billboard Hot 100 and No. 2 on the Billboard Top Tracks chart. His follow-up single, "Little Bit of Love", reached No. 77. Twilley left EMI America at that point, which once again dissipated his momentum from the hit. Twilley's 1986 album Wild Dogs was recorded for Private I Records, a custom label run by independent radio promoter Joe Isgro that was distributed by Epic Records; however, when Isgro was implicated in a 1986 radio promotion scandal, Private I Records collapsed. Instead, the album was quietly released by Epic's CBS Associated label, where it went largely unnoticed, despite the appearance of the last Twilley/Seymour song, "Shooting Stars".

After the failure of Wild Dogs, Twilley found himself without a label (or a lead guitarist, as Bill Pitcock IV had quit). Twilley wrote a parenting book based on his long-distance relationship with his daughter Dionne, entitled Questions From Dad. He then titled his next album, intended for release in 1994, The Luck. The irony did not help Twilley with record label executives, and Twilley was unable to secure distribution for it.

In 1996, EMI issued a 21-song Twilley greatest-hits collection entitled XXI, which included two new songs (one of which had been on The Luck) on its The Right Stuff reissue label, followed by reissues of the two Dwight Twilley Band studio albums the next year. All three of these releases again went out of print in 1998, when EMI discontinued the label.

However, in 1998, Pitcock rejoined Twilley, and the rise of digital audio meant that placing a record on a major label became less of a priority. In 1999, Twilley released both another rarities collection, Between the Cracks, Vol. 1 (Not Lame Records), made up of songs not owned by Shelter, EMI or CBS, and his first new album in 13 years, Tulsa (Copper Records). In 2001, Twilley finally released The Luck (Big Oak Records), although with some changes to the version he had completed in 1994. His six-song seasonal EP Have a Twilley Christmas (Digital Musicworks International, "DMI") appeared in 2004, followed by two more albums on the same label, his ninth studio album, 47 Moons, in 2005 and his first live album, Live: All Access in 2006.

Tulsa was sold to DMI (now Digital Music Group, Incorporated, or DMGI) in 2004. Additionally, the first two Twilley solo albums Twilley and Scuba Divers are available in two-disk compilations by Australia's Raven Records. Wild Dogs was reissued on CD in 2022 by Iconoclassic Records with nine bonus tracks, including the original demos for the album. Jungle was reissued on CD in 2024 by Iconoclassic Records with six bonus tracks, three tracks being listed as outtakes and the other three being demos for the album.

In November 2007, Twilley's DMGI catalog was acquired by DMGI founder and CEO, Mitchell Koulouris, who moved the artist to his new label, Gigatone. A post-major label retrospective titled Northridge to Tulsa (Twilley lived in Northridge, a neighborhood of Oklahoma City, while recording The Luck) was the first to be released by Gigatone (in December 2007). In addition, a new release of 47 Moons with bonus tracks and a remastered edition of Tulsa were also released by Gigatone in December 2007. Finally, seven volumes of outtakes, demos and live recordings in a series titled Rarities was also released by Gigatone. In 2009, Twilley released albums covering some of his favorite songs by The Beatles and other artists. In 2010, he released the album Green Blimp.

In November 2014, Twilley released his album Always through Big Oak Records. The 12-song LP featured an array of appearances from power-pop and rock and roll musicians such as Ken Stringfellow, Timm Buechler and Mitch Easter.

== Death ==
Twilley died on October 18, 2023. He suffered a massive stroke while driving, causing him to crash into a tree. He was 72.

== Discography ==
The Dwight Twilley Band

- Sincerely (1976, reissued 1989, 1997, 2007) US No. 138
- Twilley Don't Mind (1977, reissued 1990, 1997, 2007) US No. 70
- The Great Lost Twilley Album (1993)
- Live from Agora (2009, reissued 2026)

Solo

- Twilley (1979, reissued 2006) US No. 113
- Scuba Divers (1982, reissued 2006) US No. 109
- Jungle (1984) US No. 39
- Wild Dogs (1986)
- XXI (1996) - greatest hits
- Between the Cracks, Vol. 1 (1999)
- Tulsa (1999, remastered 2007)
- The Luck (2001)
- Have a Twilley Christmas (EP, 2004; expanded and remastered, 2005)
- 47 Moons (2005, reissued 2007)
- Live: All Access (2006)
- Northridge to Tulsa: The Best of Dwight Twilley 1997-2007 (2007)
- Rarities, Volume 1 (2007)
- Rarities, Volume 2 (2008)
- Rarities, Volume 3 (2008)
- Rarities, Volume 4 (2008)
- Out of the Box (2009)
- Rarities, Volume 5 (2009)
- Rarities, Volume 6 (2009)
- Rarities, Volume 7 (2009)
- Rarities, Volume 8 (2009) (unconfirmed release)
- The Beatles (2009)
- Green Blimp (2010)
- Soundtrack (2011)
- Always (2014)
- The Best Of Dwight Twilley The Tulsa Years 1999-2016 Vol 1. (2016, Big Oak Records, 2023, Paramour Records)

Videos
The Dwight Twilley Band

- "Looking for the Magic" on YouTube (with Tom Petty)

Solo

- "Girls" on YouTube (music video, with Tom Petty)
- "I'm on Fire" on YouTube (live)

Charting singles

Artist	Year	Title	US	CAN
Dwight Twilley Band	1975	"I'm on Fire"	16	57
Dwight Twilley	1984	"Girls"	16	37
Dwight Twilley	1984	"Little Bit of Love"	77	-
