= Sister Golden Hair =

Single by America

from the album Hearts
- B-side: "Midnight"
- Released: March 19, 1975
- Recorded: 1975
- Genre: Soft rock; country rock; folk rock; pop
- Length: 3:16
- Label: Warner Bros. 8086
- Songwriter: Gerry Beckley
- Producer: George Martin

America singles chronology
"Lonely People" (1974)	"Sister Golden Hair" (1975)	"Daisy Jane" (1975)

"Sister Golden Hair" is a song by the band America from their fifth album Hearts (1975), written by Gerry Beckley. It was their second single to reach number one on the U.S. Billboard Hot 100, remaining in the top position for one week.

== Background ==
Beckley says "There was no actual Sister Gold Hair." The lyrics were largely inspired by the works of Jackson Browne. Beckley commented:

[Jackson Browne] has a knack, an ability to put words to music, that is much more like the L.A. approach to just genuine observation as opposed to simplifying it down to its bare essentials... I find Jackson can depress me a little bit, but only through his honesty; and it was that style of his which led to a song of mine, "Sister Golden Hair", which is probably the more L.A. of my lyrics.

Beckley adds that "Sister Golden Hair" "was one of the first times I used 'ain't' in a song, but I wasn't making an effort to. I was just putting myself in that frame of mind and I got those kind of lyrics out of it."

Record World said it is "the story of a guy who's found love at last but doesn't necessarily want to marry her."

== Instrumentation ==
Gerry Beckley said he played the 12-string guitar, and overdubbed the prominent slide guitar. "I had a lovely lap steel that David Lindley had picked out."

== Music video ==
The music video for the song shows the band performing the song on The Midnight Special.

== Charts ==
=== Weekly charts ===
Chart (1975)	Peak position
Australia (ARIA)	28
Canada RPM Top Singles	11
Canada RPM Adult Contemporary	3
New Zealand (Recorded Music NZ)	26
US Billboard Hot 100	1
US Easy Listening (Billboard)	5
US Cash Box Top 100	2
US Record World	1
US Radio & Records	1

=== Year-end charts ===
Chart (1975)	Rank
Canada	80
U.S. Billboard Hot 100	34
U.S. Cash Box	61

== Certifications ==
Region	Certification	Certified units/sales
New Zealand (RMNZ)	2× Platinum	60,000^{‡}
^{‡} Sales+streaming figures based on certification alone.
