= Lonely People =

Single by America

from the album Holiday
- B-side: "Mad Dog"
- Released: December 1974
- Studio: AIR (London)
- Genre: Folk rock, pop rock
- Length: 2:27
- Label: Warner Bros. 8048
- Songwriters: Dan Peek, Catherine Peek
- Producer: George Martin

America singles chronology
"Tin Man" (1974)	"Lonely People" (1974)	"Sister Golden Hair" (1975)

"Lonely People" is a song written by the husband-and-wife team of Dan Peek and Catherine Peek and recorded by America. It was the second single from America's 1974 album Holiday.

== Background ==
"Lonely People" was written as an optimistic "answer song" to the Beatles' song "Eleanor Rigby". Dan Peek considered "Eleanor Rigby" an "overwhelming picture...of the masses of lost humanity, drowning in grey oblivion", and would recall being "lacerated" on first hearing the lyrics of its chorus: "All the lonely people: where do they all come from?...where do they all belong?". "Lonely People" was written within a few weeks of Dan Peek's 1973 marriage to Catherine Maberry-Peek: "I always felt like a melancholy, lonely person. And now [upon getting married] I felt like I’d won." The lyrics of "Lonely People" advise "all the lonely people": "Don't give up until you drink from the silver cup", a metaphor which Dan Peek explains: "It's possible to drink from another's well of experience...and be refreshed." Record World described it as being "about solitude and salvation."

"Lonely People" was not automatically earmarked for the Holiday album: Dan Peek unsuccessfully submitted a demo of the song for John Sebastian to consider recording.

=== Dan Peek solo release ===
After Dan Peek left America in 1977, he recalled performing "Lonely People" to close his concerts, introducing the song with words to the effect "that Jesus is the answer to loneliness". On the advice of a fan, Peek rewrote the lyrics of the song to convey a pro-Christian message and he recorded a revised version of "Lonely People" for his 1986 album Electro-Voice. This version changed the original lyrics "And ride that highway in the sky" and "You never know until you try" to "And give your heart to Jesus Christ." Peek's version was released as a single in 1986 and became a hit on contemporary Christian music stations.

== Chart performance ==
"Lonely People" reached number five on the Billboard Hot 100, the Peeks' only credited song to reach that chart's top 10, and was America's second number one on the Easy Listening chart, where it stayed for one week in February 1975.

=== America version ===
Chart (1975)	Peak position
Australia	43
Canada RPM Top Singles	16
Canada RPM Adult Contemporary	3
US Billboard Hot 100	5
US Billboard Easy Listening	1
US Cash Box Singles Chart	10
US Record World Singles Chart	9
US Radio & Records Singles Chart	12

=== Dan Peek version ===
Chart (1986)	Peak position
CCM Hot Hits	2
CCM Hot AC Hits	1

== Other versions ==
Jars of Clay recorded "Lonely People" for their 2003 album Who We Are Instead. Their version was featured on The WB TV series Everwood and was on the 2004 Everwood soundtrack album.

In 2024, Christian folk singer J.J. Heller recorded "Lonely People" for her album I Dream of You: HOME.

== See also ==
- List of number-one adult contemporary singles of 1975 (U.S.)
