= Agora Theatre and Ballroom =

Music venue in Cleveland, Ohio

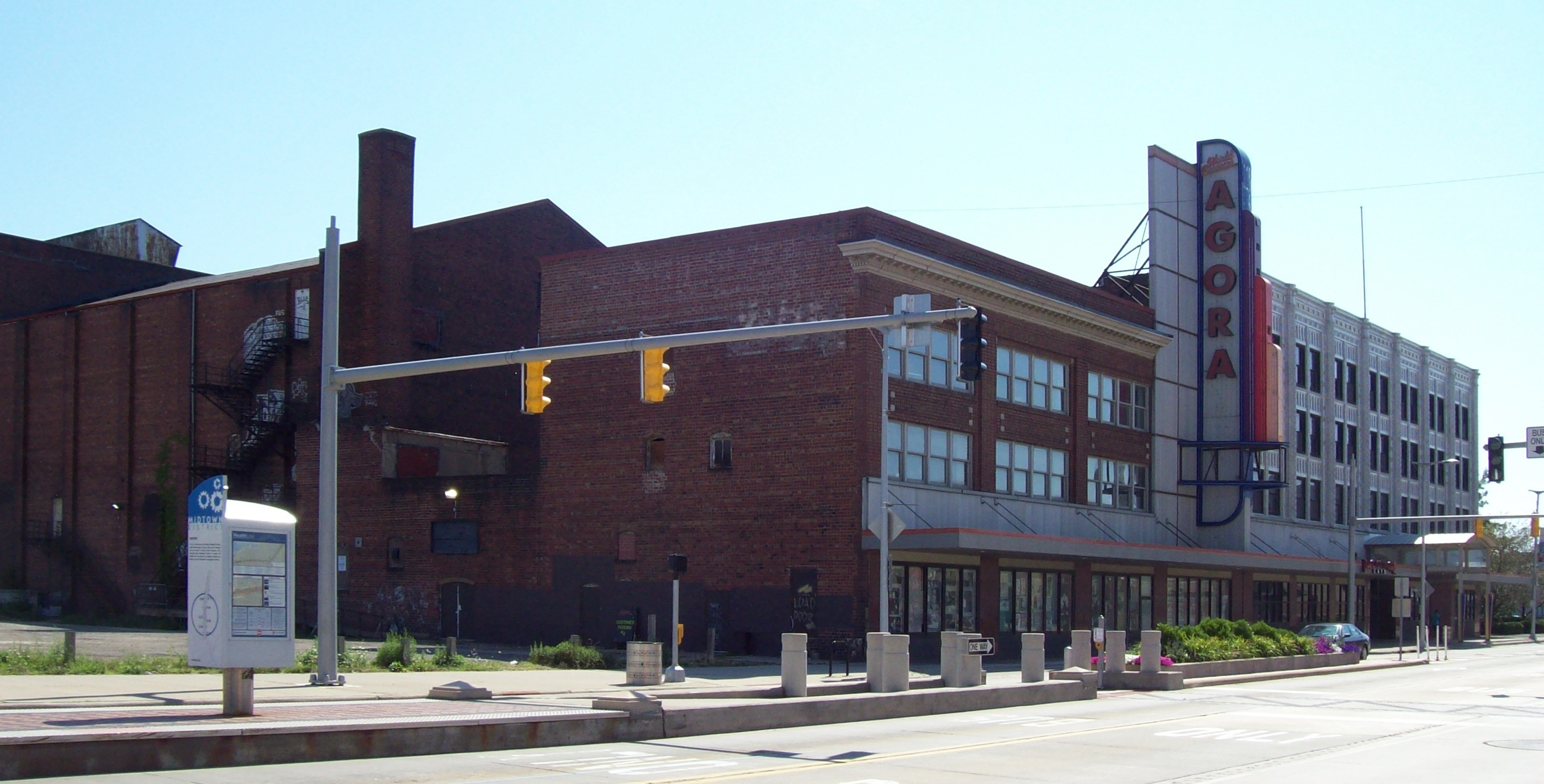
- Interactive map of Agora Theatre and Ballroom
- Former names: Metropolitan Theatre; WHK Auditorium; Cleveland Grande; New Hippodrome Theatre
- Address: 5000 Euclid Avenue; Cleveland, Ohio 44103
- Location: United States
- Coordinates: 41°30′14″N 81°39′13″W
- Owner: MidTown Cleveland Inc.
- Capacity: 2,000
- Type: Concert hall
- Event: Rock
- Public transit: HealthLine at East 51st Street

Construction
- Opened: March 31, 1913
- Renovated: October 3, 1986; January 2018

Website
- agoracleveland.com

The Agora Theatre and Ballroom (commonly known as the Cleveland Agora, or simply, the Agora) is a music venue located in Cleveland, Ohio.

Hank LoConti opened the first Agora on February 27, 1966, near the campus of Case Western Reserve University in Cleveland. His concept of promoting live entertainment for young adults was an instant success and audiences outgrew both the building and the neighborhood almost immediately.

== History and timeline ==
Henry (Hank) LoConti opened the first Agora in 1966 near the campus of Case Western Reserve University in Cleveland, Ohio.

In 1968, a new Cleveland Agora Beta opened its doors in another building near the Cleveland State University campus where it grew into the most influential concert club in the nation. Initially Hank never imagined the Agora would evolve into a major force in the international concert scene and grow to become a premier concert club facility in the US.

In the years that followed, the Agora clubs played a major role in developing the music and entertainment industry in Cleveland and the nation by booking and producing thousands of local, national, and international groups to perform on Agora stages in 13 cities.

In 1968 the Agora booked its first international act, the Buckinghams. For many years, “Monday Night Out at the Agora” was nicknamed “Golden” because of the concept of showcasing original music groups who kept the club filled. Terry Knight & The Pack, better known as Grand Funk Railroad, The Outlaws, ZZ Top, Glass Harp, Foghat, Peter Frampton, Bob Seger, Kiss, Boston, Meat Loaf, Todd Rundgren and Talking Heads (to name a few) all achieved national and international prominence after playing the Cleveland Agora stage. In addition, the club served as a showcase for local bands and Sunday nights were reserved for original local bands such as Rainbow Canyon, The Raspberries, and the James Gang.

The Agora also had a downstairs club called The Mistake and later named Pop Shop, where many bands from folk to metal performed. The club hosted music industry private parties and was visited by legends, such as The Velvet Underground's Nico, who played there in 1972.

Backstage at the Agora, production personnel grew in experience and knowledge. Production techniques created and honed in at the Agora developed professionals that went on to become employed nationally and internationally as the music industry developed and groups began to tour. Untold numbers of lighting and sound engineers, managers, stage managers, roadies, and record and radio promotions personnel polished their abilities by working behind the scenes at The Agora. The Agora, as one successful ex-employee referred to it, was his “Rock-And-Roll College.”

Hank LoConti and his nephew Gary from the beginning were trendsetters. Their dedication, intuition, and creativity led The Agora in developing the Cleveland music industry to many firsts.

In 1968, The Cleveland Agora built the first concert venue in-house recording studio, Agency Recording Studios, to produce records, live broadcasts from the Agora stage, and radio programs in stereo.

In 1970, the LoContis opened the Agora in Columbus, OH in the old State Theatre on the Ohio State University campus, across the street from the student union. Operated and booked by Gary LoConti that year, The Agora teamed up with WNCI-FM to produce the first Agora live broadcast. The artist was Ted Nugent. That same year The Cleveland Agora was the first to broadcast live Rock-and-Roll from its stage in association with WNCR-FM Radio, “WNCR Live From The Agora.” In 1971, The Agora and WNCR broadcast concerts with Iggy Pop and the Stooges and Alice Cooper. These legendary WNCR live broadcasts from The Agora gave birth to The Agora's first weekly radio program, “Live From The Agora.” WNCR went on to become the number one progressive radio station in the U.S. On January 1, 1973, WNCR changed formats, and WMMS began to record “WMMS Live From The Agora” on Mondays and run the broadcast from WMMS on Wednesdays. WMMS soon thereafter became the number one radio station in the U.S., cementing Cleveland as the Rock-and-Roll capital of the world.

In 1973, The Agora announced its expansion from radio into television. The Agora in Columbus produced and videotaped the “Music, You’re My Mother” TV special. The first stereo rock-and-roll radio/television simulcast for national syndication in concert club history. On October 21, 1978, the first videotaped production, “Onstage at the Agora,” was broadcast live on television, featuring Southside Johnny and the Asbury Jukes. This TV special went on to feature such acts as Todd Rundgren, Eddie Money, Meat Loaf, Ian Hunter with Mick Ronson, Iron City House Rockers, The Boyzz, Toto, and Charlie Daniels. These Emmy nominated shows were simulcast live on CBS – WJW TV and WMMS and broadcast to 300 markets in 46 states.

By converting to recorded shows with WMMS, The Agora became the first concert club in America to syndicate radio programs to emerging progressive radio markets throughout the U.S. In 1975, as the syndicated recorded concert series continued to gain popularity, The Agora started a second radio program financed by major sponsors such as Sansui of Japan, titled the “New World of Jazz.” This show was kicked off by syndicating a Live recorded Ronnie Laws's concert to over 50 stations in the U.S., Europe, South America, Asia, and Australia.

In 1978, The Agora was the first concert club to use dedicated ISDN telephone lines to broadcast a live special event to 37 progressive radio markets throughout the U.S. The artist was Bruce Springsteen. In addition to The Agora radio network broadcasts, ABC's “King Biscuit Flower Hour” also ran The Agora's live radio shows nationally.

Traditions were born as “Monday Night Out at the Agora” became a weekly concert event in Cleveland. The Agora's “WMMS Coffee Break Concerts” were broadcast live every Wednesday from 11 AM to noon featuring the new local, national, and international acts.

The Agora's expansion into national and international radio and television production in the 70s and ensuing prominence inspired the LoConti's to build 12 other Agora concert clubs throughout the U.S. for a total of 13 clubs and establish Buckeye Music Center 43 miles east of the Columbus Agora. Buckeye Lake Music Center was a nationally renowned outdoor festival facility which occupied 265 acres of land with a maximum festival capacity of 60,000.

In 1979, further Agora expansion included record and film production. The Michael Stanley Band's live album, “Stage Pass”, was recorded there as well as Todd Rundgren's live double LP “Back to the Bars” in 1978. Bruce Springsteen and the E Street Band played their infamous WMMS 10th anniversary show there in August 1978. Bruce's live show was eventually released on December 23, 2014, and became a top selling album. Hank started a record label called Agora Records and released the fourth album by Virginia-based Artful Dodger and Clevland based bands like Wild Horses and BeauCoup. The film “One Trick Pony” starring Paul Simon and featuring The B52's was produced at the Cleveland Agora.

The Agora received Columbia Records 1970 “Best Club in the Country” Award. In addition The Agora was nominated five years in a row for Billboard's “Best Club in the Country” Award and won this award in 1980. The Agora's President, Hank LoConti received Billboard's Steve Wolfe Memorial Award in 1979, presented to the individual who has contributed the most to the music entertainment industry throughout the year.

It was during the 70s that Hank started a crusade to establish the international music industry's Rock-And-Roll Hall of Fame and Museum in Cleveland, Ohio. In 1980, he gave a presentation to executives in New York, only to be told that when the Rock Hall was built, it would be in New York. He then wrote to Dick Clark to convince him that the Rock Hall belonged in Cleveland. Dick Clark wrote back that when the Rock Hall was built, it would be in Los Angeles. In 1984, Hank and Nick met with Michael Benz of the Greater Cleveland Growth Association to assist in developing a proposal to establish the Rock-And-Roll Hall of Fame in Cleveland. Michael vowed to do his best to field a team of Cleveland leaders and requested Hank and Nick to do the same with music industry leaders. Hank called an old friend, Norman Nite, a nationally syndicated New York disc jockey and author of the book “Rock On.” Mr. Nite was on the newly- formed National Board of the Rock-And-Roll Hall of Fame in New York and agreed to assist Hank with the project. Hank and Mr. Benz, along with a most distinguished lineup of professionals, rewrote the history of rock.

The Agora chain continued its growth throughout the early part of the 1980s until The Cleveland Agora suffered a fire in October 1984. In 1985, Hank gathered his partners and purchased the old WHK radio studios and auditorium in the Midtown Corridor located at 5000 Euclid Ave. in Cleveland. It was there in the WHK radio studios during 1951, that Cleveland disc jockey Allen Freed first coined the phrase “Rock-and-Roll” for the world.

At the time of the move, the Midtown Corridor Association was in its infancy, and it became a true pioneering venture to build the Agora in a neighborhood that was perceived as anything but safe. This historic building, originally opened as the Metropolitan Theater in 1912, housed the Cleveland Opera until 1929, and became the WHK Studio One in 1950. WMMS, the most famous radio station ever to broadcast Rock-and-Roll, also called this building home. After Hank's passing The Agora changed hands and is currently operated by AEG and carries on the long tradition of producing world-class entertainment and introducing new as well as established artists to Cleveland, Ohio.

To quote music industry photographer and writer Anastasia Pantsios: "Hank will be remembered by the thousands of people whose paths he crossed as someone who had a good heart, who would go out of his way to help almost anyone, and who never engaged in the underhanded and deceitful tactics so prevalent in the music business. In a scene riddled with scam artists, he was a straight shooter. He jump started the careers not only of musicians, but also his legendary crew members the 'Rowdy Roadies,' and the people who worked in booking, promotions, and ticketing in his office. Many still work in the music business today."

=== Cornell Road ===
The first Agora in Cleveland, informally referred to as Agora Alpha, opened on February 27, 1966, at 2175 Cornell Road in Little Italy near the campus of Case Western Reserve University. The location was originally called "Nino's Pizza". Ted Nugent, Measles, James Gang, My Uncles Army Buddies, Freeport, and Decembers Children were the first bands. It was an instant success. They issued Memberships due to the long lines. The residential neighborhood of "Little Italy" did not like the college kids parking every which way on the streets and making loud noises at the end of the night. These neighborhood residents converged on the Agora one night like a movie scene from the Villagers storming the Frankenstein Castle, and made it well known that the club was not welcome. A new lease was signed and the new Agora opened up at 1724 E 24th, near Payne Avenue, temporarily named Agora "Beta" with Hank LoConti President and operating/shareholder. That was the start of Agora Promotions. Bands that played included: Grateful Dead, Genesis, King Crimson, Howling Wolf, Procol Harum, Alice Cooper, War, Chuck Berry, Eagles, Bob Seger, MC5, Beach Boys, Santana, Muddy Waters, to name a few.

=== East 24th Street ===
In 1968, the Agora moved to a second building on East 24th Street near the campus of Cleveland State University. Once settled in their new location, the new Agora Ballroom, informally referred to as Agora Beta, played a role in giving exposure to many bands, both from the Cleveland area, and elsewhere. Many artists such as Peter Frampton, Bruce Springsteen, Boston, Grand Funk Railroad, ZZ Top, Kiss and many others received much exposure after playing the Agora. The Agora Ballroom was also the setting of the concert by Paul Simon's character in the opening minutes of the 1980 movie One-Trick Pony. The front facade of the Agora Ballroom was temporarily swapped for the one shown in the movie. It is also one of three locations used to record Todd Rundgren's live album Back to the Bars in 1978.

The East 24th Street building also housed Agency Recording Studios, located above the Agora. The onsite recording studio and the close proximity to radio station WMMS allowed for high-quality live concert broadcasts from the Agora. Some of these concerts were later released commercially, including Bruce Springsteen's The Agora, Cleveland 1978, the Cars' Live at the Agora 1978, Ian Hunter's You're Never Alone with a Schizophrenic Deluxe Edition and Dwight Twilley Band's Live From Agora.

The popularity of the club led the Agora to expand during the 1970s and 1980s, opening 12 other clubs in the cities of Columbus, Toledo, Youngstown, Painesville, Akron, Atlanta, Dallas, Houston, Tampa, Hallandale, Hartford, and New Haven. However, the Cleveland location is the only one still in existence today.

On May 3, 1982, the attendees at the Huey Lewis and the News concert inspired Huey Lewis to write the song, "The Heart of Rock & Roll." Lewis was skeptical that the Cleveland rock scene was better than his home area of San Francisco, but the appreciation of the show and participation of the fans caused him to realize it was the heart of rock & roll.

In 1984, the Agora was damaged by a fire and closed. Two years later, the Agora reopened in a new location at 5000 Euclid Avenue, in the former WHK Auditorium east of Downtown Cleveland. The new Agora was owned and operated by concert promoter Nick Matzorkis in partnership with Hank LoConti. The grand opening of the new Agora took place on November 25, 1988, and it featured the Ian Hunter/Mick Ronson Band and special guest Jack Bruce, bassist for Cream. During the four years that Matzorkis owned and operated the Agora, the venue hosted hundreds of acts, including Neil Young, Keith Richards and Ron Wood, Bob Dylan, David Crosby, Humble Pie, and others. It has remained there since, and today is still a popular concert club, with many national as well as international acts playing there when they stop in Cleveland.

== History of 5000 Euclid Avenue ==
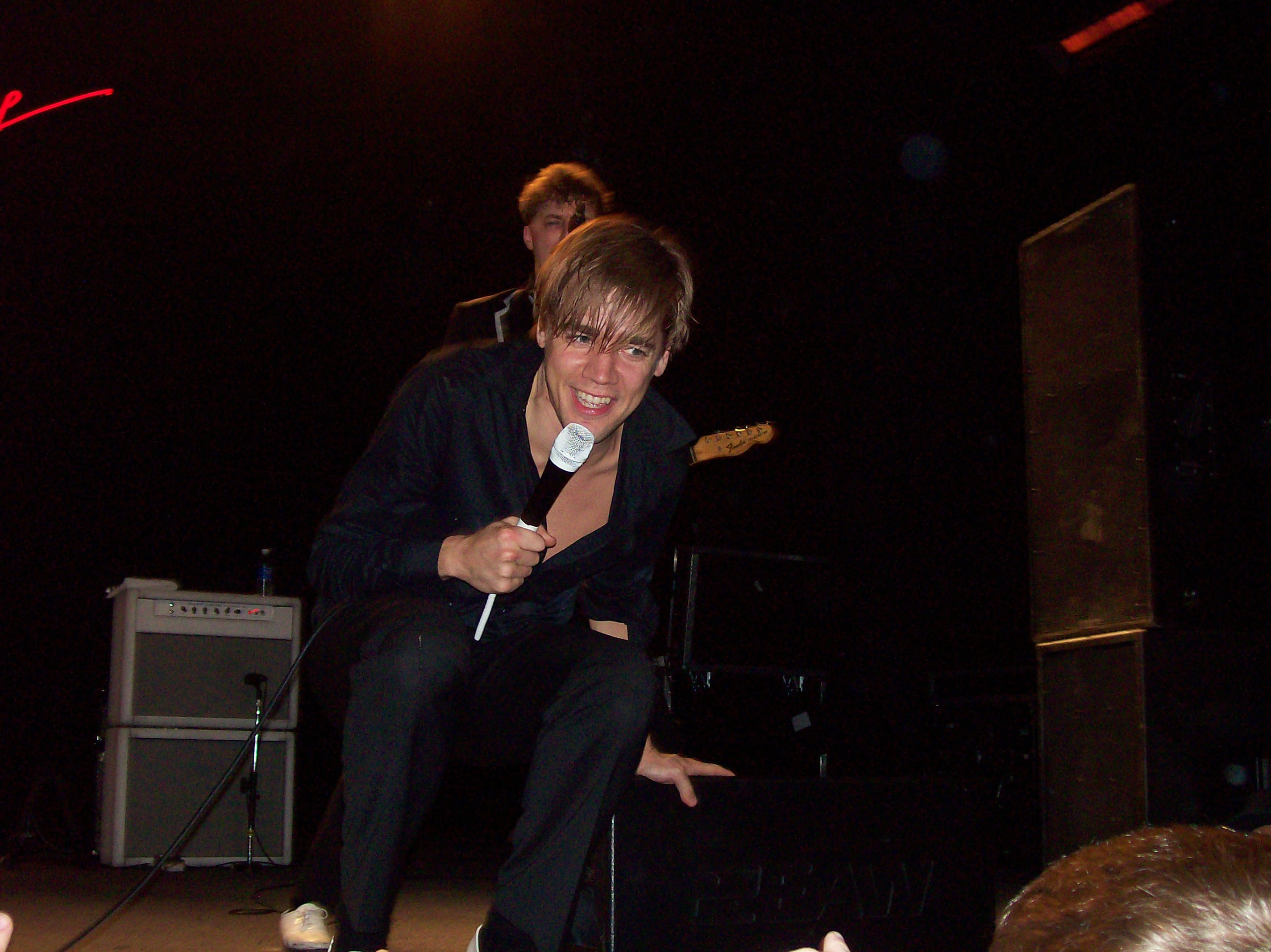
Pelle Almqvist of The Hives performs at the Cleveland Agora in 2008.

The building currently known as the Agora first opened on March 31, 1913, with an English performance of Aida as the Metropolitan Theatre. It was the brainchild of Max Faetkenheuer, an opera promoter and conductor who had also been involved in the construction of the monumental Hippodrome Theatre on Euclid Avenue five years earlier. The new opera house was well received and did well early on, but later struggled to stay profitable. Among various uses, the Metropolitan was home to a Cleveland's Yiddish theatre troupe in 1927. This brief episode in its history came to an end a few months later in 1928 after the troupe was involved in a bus accident on the way to a performance in Youngstown; the actors were too injured to perform and the venture went bankrupt. By 1932, the venue had turned into a vaudeville/burlesque house called "The Gayety," hosting "hoofers, comics and strippers." The Metropolitan returned to its original use for a short time during the mid-1940s staging comedic musicals, but by the end of the decade stage productions had ceased and the theatre became a full-time movie house. From 1951–78, the theater offices were home to radio stations WHK (1420 AM) and WMMS (100.7 FM; formerly WHK-FM); the theater itself was known as the WHK Auditorium. In 1968–69 the theater was known as the Cleveland Grande. In the early 1980s, it briefly re-opened as the New Hippodrome Theatre showing movies.

Following the fire which damaged the Agora Ballroom on East 24th Street, club owner Henry LoConti Sr. decided to move to the 5000 Euclid Avenue location. Following extensive renovations, the new Agora Metropolitan Theater, the third Cleveland venue to bear the Agora name, opened in October 1986. The Agora has two rooms: a 500-person capacity, standing-room-only ballroom with adjoining bar, and an 1800-seat theater. It is available for rentals and hosts nationally touring acts. Plans are underway to reopen the Backstage Cafe. The Agora is the host of Cleveland-based band Mushroomhead's annual Halloween show.

Henry LoConti Sr. died on July 8, 2014, at age 85.
