= Crossover (figure skating) =

Basic stroking technique in figure skating

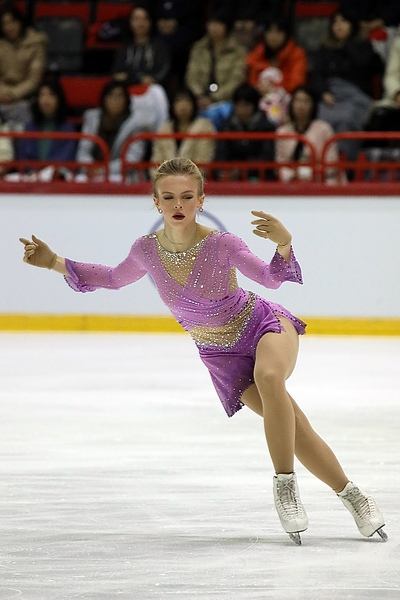
Emmi Peltonen performing a clockwise forward crossover.

Crossovers are a basic stroking technique in figure skating for gaining speed while skating along a curve or circle. They may be performed while skating either forwards or backwards.

== Description ==
To perform forward crossovers in a counterclockwise direction, the skater begins with a stroke onto the left forward outside edge. The right foot is next placed on the ice towards the toe of the left foot and positioned on an inner edge, slightly inside the running curve. The right foot gradually becomes the new skating foot as the left foot leaves the curve to the outside and thrusts away. As the transfer of weight takes place, the skater pushes off the outside edge of the left foot. The next stroke is performed by placing the left foot next to the right, inside the circle, and pushing off the inside edge of the right foot. The upper body is generally turned to face into the circle with the arms extended.

To perform counterclockwise backward crossovers, the skater begins by gliding backwards on two feet. The upper body is turned to face into the circle, and the head is turned to look over the right shoulder in the direction of travel. Keeping the left foot on the ice, the skater shifts his or her weight to the right foot, on a back outside edge, and then draws the left foot across the right. At this point, the skater shifts weight to the left foot, on a back inside edge, and executes a wide step inside the circle with the right foot; then the sequence is repeated by again drawing the left foot across. The left foot remains on the ice throughout, and the power derives from the scissoring motion of the legs.

For crossovers on a clockwise curve, left and right are reversed.

Crossovers are not considered difficult connecting movements in competitive skating; a program in which the skater predominantly performs crossovers from one element to the next rather than more complex steps and turns will be judged to be lacking in difficulty and choreographic interest.

== Gallery ==
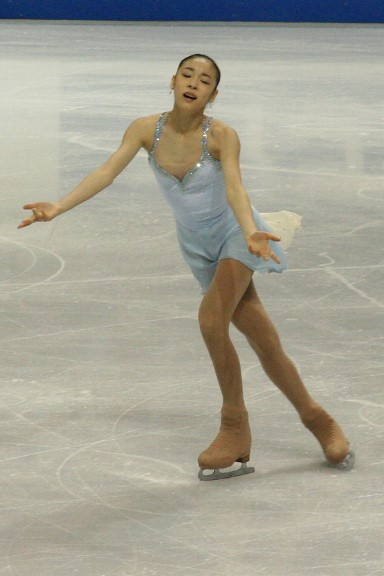
Clockwise forward crossover, at the point where the skater is pushing off the right foot.
(Yuna Kim)

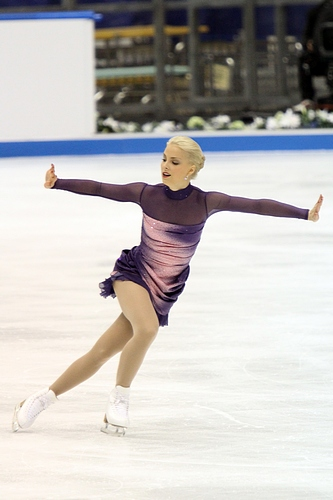
Counterclockwise forward crossover, at the point where the skater is pushing off the left foot.
(Kiira Korpi)

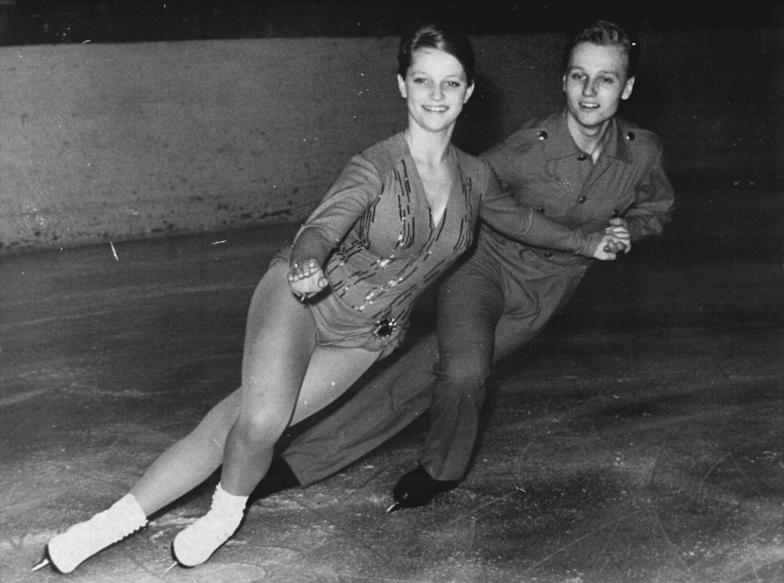
Pair forward crossover
(Eva Romanova & Pavel Roman)

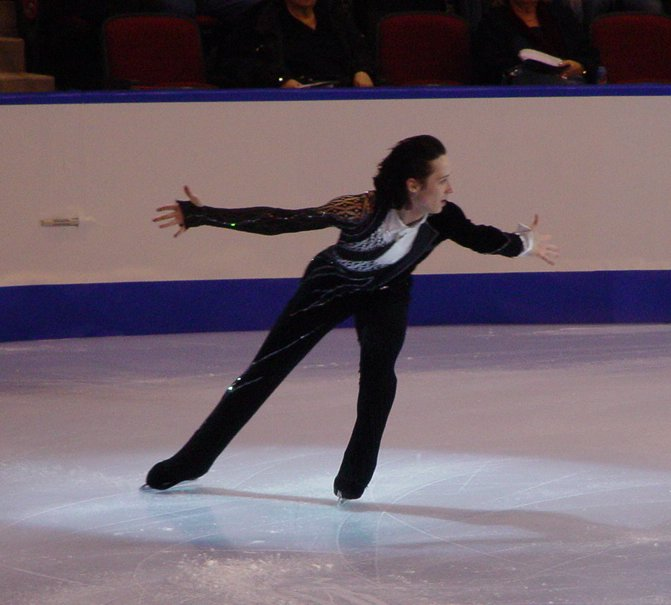
Clockwise back crossover, during the scissoring motion after the wide step.
(Johnny Weir)

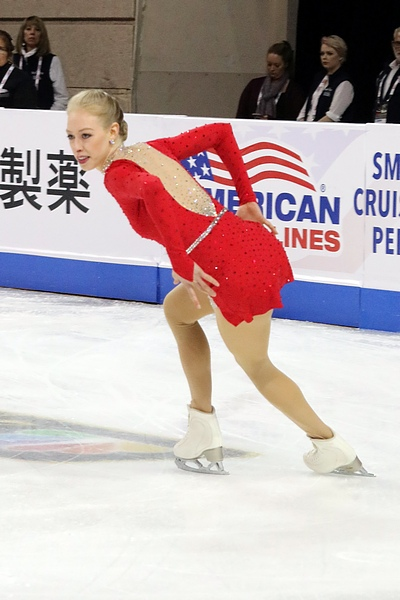
Crossover as seen from the back.
(Bradie Tennell)
