= Ventura Highway =

1972 single by America

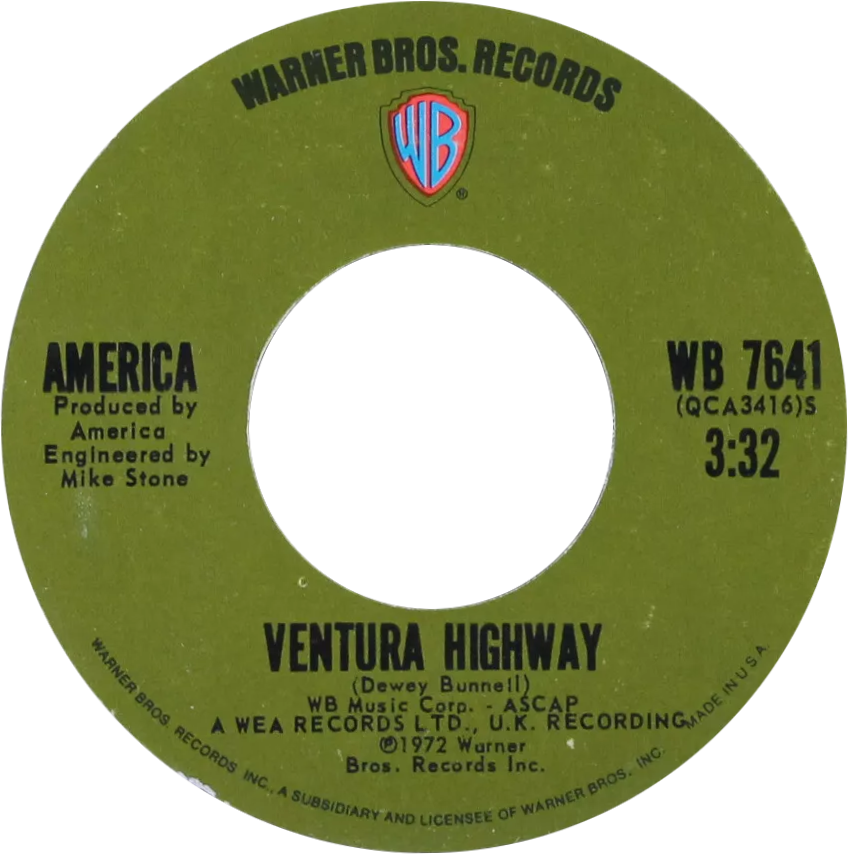
- Side A of the US single

Single by America

from the album Homecoming
- B-side: "Saturn Nights"
- Released: September 19, 1972
- Recorded: 1972
- Studio: The Record Plant, Los Angeles
- Genre: Soft rock; folk-pop
- Length: 3:32
- Label: Warner Bros.
- Songwriter: Dewey Bunnell
- Producer: America

America singles chronology
| "I Need You" (1972) | "Ventura Highway" (1972) | "Don't Cross the River" (1973) |

Audio
- "Ventura Highway" on YouTube

"Ventura Highway" is a 1972 song by the American rock band America, released on their second studio album, Homecoming. Written by Dewey Bunnell, the song reached the #8 spot on the US Billboard Hot 100 and #43 in the UK singles chart. The song remains one of the band's most popular and well-recognized.

== Background ==
Dewey Bunnell, the song's vocalist and writer, has said that the lyric "alligator lizards in the air" in the song is a reference to the shapes of clouds in the sky he saw in 1963 while his family was driving down the coast from Vandenberg Air Force Base near Lompoc, California, where they had a flat tire. While his father changed the tire, he and his brother stood by the side of the road, watched the clouds, and saw a road sign for Ventura.

In the booklet for the boxed set, Highway, he states that the song "reminds me of the time I lived in Omaha as a kid and how we'd walk through cornfields and chew on pieces of grass. There were cold winters, and I had images of going to California. So I think in the song I'm talking to myself, frankly: 'How long you gonna stay here, Joe?' I really believe that 'Ventura Highway' has the most lasting power of all my songs. It's not just the words — the song and the track have a certain fresh, vibrant, optimistic quality that I can still respond to". The song has a "Go West, young man" motif in the structure of a conversation between an old man named Joe and a young and hopeful kid. Joe was modeled after a "grumpy" old man he had met while his dad was stationed in Biloxi, Mississippi, at Keesler Air Force Base. He also stated "I remember vividly having this mental picture of the stretch of the coastline traveling with my family when I was younger. Ventura Highway itself, there is no such beast, what I was really trying to depict was the Pacific Coast Highway, Highway 1, which goes up to the town of Ventura."

"That's Gerry and Dan doing a harmony on two guitars on the intro. I remember us sitting in a hotel room, and I was playing the chords, and Gerry got that guitar line, and he and Dan worked out that harmony part. That's really the hook of the song".

== Reception ==
Record World said that the "threesome come out of the desert and onto the road in this refreshing number that features those great harmonies and acoustic guitars."

The song went to number 8 on the Billboard Hot 100 for America, spending 12 weeks on the charts after debuting on October 21, 1972. It also reached number 43 in the UK Singles Chart, staying in that chart for 4 weeks.

== Legacy ==
The song contains the phrase "purple rain", later the title of the 1984 song, album, film and tour, from the artist Prince. Whether any connection actually exists, both Mikel Toombs of The San Diego Union and Bob Kostanczuk of the Post-Tribune have written that Prince got the title directly from "Ventura Highway". Asked to explain the phrase "purple rain" in "Ventura Highway", Gerry Beckley responded: "You got me."

The song won many fans, including the pro wrestler-turned-politician, Jesse Ventura. Bunnell recalled, "We went and played at Governor Jesse Ventura's inaugural out in Minneapolis. He asked us to — his wife is a horse lady, and she'd always loved 'A Horse with No Name', and he had adopted this name Ventura. So when he put together his cast of characters for his big inaugural celebration, he wanted us to come and play two songs, which we did".

== Chart performance ==
=== Weekly charts ===
| Chart (1972–1973) | Peak position |
|---|---|
| Australia (KMR) | 28 |
| Canada RPM Top Singles | 5 |
| Canada RPM Adult Contemporary | 42 |
| New Zealand (Listener) | 12 |
| UK Singles (Official Charts) | 43 |
| US Billboard Easy Listening | 3 |
| US Billboard Hot 100 | 8 |
| US Cash Box Top 100 | 8 |
| US Record World Singles Chart | 7 |

=== Year-end charts ===
| Chart (1972) | Position |
|---|---|
| Canada (RPM) | 53 |
| US (Joel Whitburn's Pop Annual) | 80 |

== Certifications ==
| Region | Certification | Certified units/sales |
|---|---|---|
| New Zealand (RMNZ) | 2× Platinum | 60,000^{‡} |
| United Kingdom (BPI) | Gold | 400,000^{‡} |
^{‡} Sales+streaming figures based on certification alone.

== Sampling and cover versions ==
- The song's opening guitar riff and musical hook is sampled throughout Janet Jackson's 2001 song "Someone to Call My Lover" by the production team of Jimmy Jam and Terry Lewis who were influenced by America and "Ventura Highway" listening to KDWB 63 AM (Top 40) growing up in Minneapolis, Minnesota (along with their close friend, musician Prince). Bunnell said the use of the sample from "Ventura Highway" and the production by Jam, Lewis and Jackson boosted sales for America.
- In 2004, the song was recorded by Paul Hardcastle for the compilation album Jazzmasters (The Smooth Cuts) featuring Helen Rogers on vocals.
- In 2012, the song was recorded by the private party band The Gypsy Queens for their album The Gypsy Queens, featuring Booker T. Jones, as well as Gerry Beckley and Dewey Bunnell (author of the song) of the original America line-up.
