= EuroSport Crossover =

Crossover
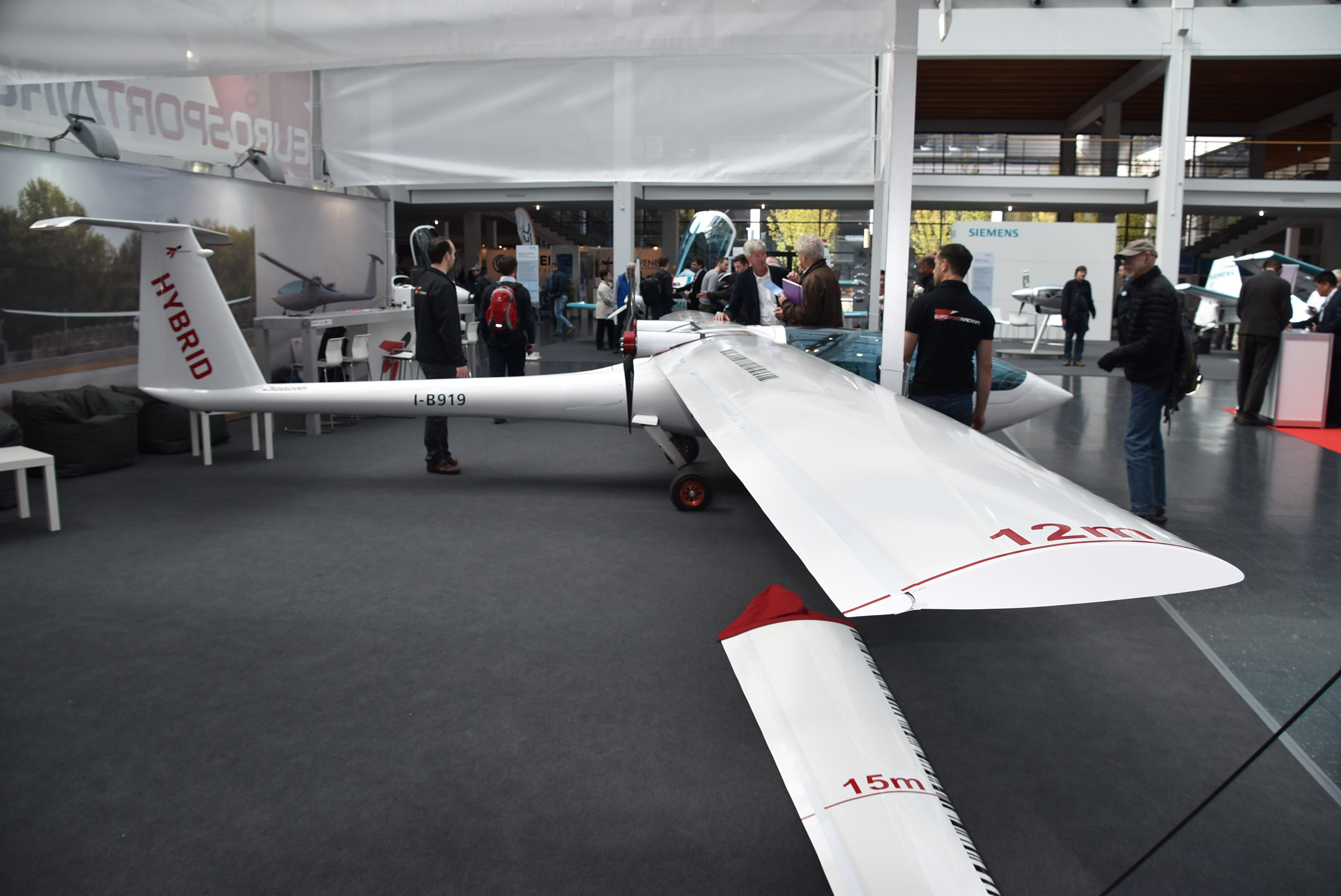

General information
- Type: Electric motorglider
- National origin: Portugal
- Manufacturer: Eurosport Aircraft Lda

History
- First flight: 23 July 2013

The EuroSport Crossover is an electrically powered two seat motor glider and ultralight aircraft designed and built in Portugal.

== Design and development ==
The Crossover has a largely epoxy resin and carbon fibre structure. The three part wing has a rectangular plan, 6.5 m (21 ft 4 in) span central section and detachable trapezoidal outer panels, each either 1.55 m (5 ft 1 in) or 4.25 m (13 ft 11 in) long for the 9.60 m (31 ft 6 in) and15.00 m (49 ft 3 in) span variants respectively. The wingtips have tall, narrow winglets. The trailing edge of the inner section is filled by two-section, double slotted, electrically driven Fowler flaps, with ailerons on the outer panels.

The fuselage is rounded in cross-section, with a long, low, forward-hinged and electrically operated canopy over the two side-by-side seats, which are provided with dual controls. Behind the wing the fuselage tapers to a T-tail. The fin is swept and straight-edged and the rudder is straight-edged, electrically trimmed and vertical. A straight tapered tailplane has a single, electrically powered elevator. The Crossover has a fuselage-mounted tricycle undercarriage. All wheels are the same size and retract forwards; the mainwheels have brakes and the nosewheel is steerable.

Power is supplied by two three-phase electric motors, each capable of providing 40 kW (54 hp) for take-off and 30 kW (40 hp) continuously, controlled together by a single throttle lever. These are mounted in the fuselage, with the four lithium batteries, storing a total energy of 36 kWh, just behind the cockpit at the centre of gravity. Several different propeller configurations have been considered, including a single nose-mounted propeller or a single propeller mounted near the top of the vertical tail. The initial trials were made with twin, contra-rotating propellers on arms that fold forward out of the fuselage just behind the wing trailing edge. Doors ensure that the fuselage is aerodynamically clean with or without the deployment of the propellers.

The Crossover began its flight testing with short hops on 23 July 2013. Tests of the fin-mounted propeller configuration began with taxying runs on 12 November that year.

== Variants ==
Long span wing
Motor glider with 15.00 m (49 ft 3 in) span.
Short span version
Ultralight glider with 9.60 m (31 ft 6 in) span.
Variable span
Proposed in-flight telescopically variable span wing.

== Specifications (9.60 m span) ==
Data from Jane's All the World's Aircraft 2015/16 p.

General characteristics

- Crew: One pilot,
- Capacity: one passenger
- Length: 6.90 m (22 ft 8 in)
- Wingspan: 9.60 m (31 ft 6 in)
- Height: 2.05 m (6 ft 9 in)
- Empty weight: 307 kg (677 lb)
- Gross weight: 600 kg (1,323 lb)
- Fuel capacity: 4×9 kWh lithium batteries
- Propellers: 2-bladed Helix-Carbon, 1.46 m (4 ft 9 in) diameter contra-rotating retractable; ground-adjustable pitch

Performance

- Cruise speed: 220 km/h (140 mph, 120 kn)
- Never exceed speed: 249 km/h (155 mph, 134 kn)
- g limits: +4/-2
- Rate of climb: 6.0 m/s (1,180 ft/min) at sea level
- Power/mass: 0.13 kW/kg (0.081 hp/lb)
