= Tin Man (America song) =

Single by America

from the album Holiday
- B-side: "In the Country"
- Released: August 1974
- Recorded: 1974
- Studio: AIR (London)
- Genre: Soft rock; soft pop
- Length: 3:25
- Label: Warner Bros. 7839
- Songwriter: Dewey Bunnell
- Producer: George Martin

America singles chronology
"Green Monkey" (1974)	"Tin Man" (1974)	"Lonely People" (1974)

Official audio
- "Tin Man" on YouTube

"Tin Man" is a 1974 song by the pop rock band America. It was written by band member Dewey Bunnell and produced by George Martin, who also plays the piano part on the recorded version. The song was included on the band's 1974 album Holiday.

== Background ==
The song's title and some of its lyrics refer to the Tin Woodman from The Wizard of Oz. Songwriter Bunnell was quoted describing the parallel: "My favorite movie, I guess. I always loved it as a kid. Very obscure lyrics. Great grammar - 'Oz never did give nothing to the Tin Man.' It's sort of a poetic license."

Dan Peek, who described "Tin Man" as "quintessential Dewey, easy stream of consciousness with a major seventh acoustic bed", said that Bunnell "actually begged us not to record the song. Knowing Dewey, it was probably reverse psychology; if it was, Gerry [Beckley] and I fell for it, insisting it was perfect for the album."

Released as the first single from Holiday, "Tin Man" became the band's fourth top-10 hit in the US, spending three weeks at number four on the Billboard Hot 100 in November 1974. The song reached number one on the Billboard easy listening chart in October of that year. In the UK, the song was relegated to the B-side of another album track, "Mad Dog", released in July, but neither side charted.

== Charts ==
=== Weekly charts ===
Chart (1974)	Peak position
Canada RPM Top Singles	7
Canada RPM Adult Contemporary	5
US Adult Contemporary (Billboard)	1
US Billboard Hot 100	4
US Cash Box Top 100	6
US Record World	6
US Radio & Records	2

=== Year-end charts ===
Chart (1974)	Rank
Canada RPM Top Singles	84
US (Joel Whitburn's Pop Annual)	51

== Cover versions ==
A Finnish rendering of "Tin Man" entitled "Toisin käy" was recorded by Finnish band Cascade in 1974. Funk band Chocolate Milk also covered the song on their 1975 debut Action Speaks Louder Than Words.

Brazilian singer Ivo Meirelles recorded a Portuguese rendering of "Tin Man" entitled "Swing Man" for his 2004 album Samba Soul. The group Incognito also recorded the song on their album Bees + Things + Flowers (2006) which features singer Carleen Anderson.

Evan Olson released a cover of the song in his 1999 album One Room.

== See also ==
- List of number-one adult contemporary singles of 1974 (U.S.)
