= Cross Over (album) =

Studio album by Dan Peek
- Released: 1987
- Genre: Contemporary Christian music, soft rock
- Label: Greentree
- Producer: Dan Peek

Dan Peek chronology
Electro-Voice (1986)	Cross Over (1987)	The Best of Dan Peek (1988)

Cross Over is the fourth solo album by former America member Dan Peek, released in 1987.

The title track was the first single from the album and reached 13 on the contemporary Christian music chart. "I Will Not Be Silent" also charted on the CCM Adult chart.

== Track listing ==
All songs written by Dan Peek, except where noted.

1. "Cross Over"
2. "I Will Not Be Silent" (Brian Gentry, Ken Marvin, Terry Sachen)
3. "I Know There's an Answer"
4. "His Own"
5. "My Jesus"
6. "Get Ready"
7. "The Night"
8. "Press On" (Brian Gentry, Ken Marvin)
9. "The Last of Me"
