= Jungle (Dwight Twilley album) =

Studio album by Dwight Twilley
- Released: 1984
- Genre: Power pop, rock
- Label: EMI America

Dwight Twilley chronology
Scuba Divers (1982)	Jungle (1984)	Wild Dogs (1986)

Jungle is an album by the American musician Dwight Twilley, released in 1984.

The album reached No. 39 on the Billboard 200; "Girls" peaked at No. 16 on the Billboard Hot 100. Despite Jungle's success, Twilley left EMI America for the mob-connected Private Eye Records.

A cover of "Why You Wanna Break My Heart", by Tia Carrere, appears on Wayne's World: Music from the Motion Picture.

== Production ==
Susan Cowsill and Tom Petty contributed vocals to the album; Mike Campbell played guitar. The intro to "Girls" contains an interpolation of some Maurice Chevalier music.

The video for "Girls" was inspired by Porky's.

== Critical reception ==
Professional ratings
Review scores
Source	Rating
AllMusic	3/5 stars
The Encyclopedia of Popular Music	3/5 stars
Knight-Ridder	8/10
Philadelphia Daily News	3/4 stars

Orange Coast wrote that "the single-laden LP features rocking melodies and rich vocals, which are often reminiscent of the Beatles' Mersey sound." The Philadelphia Daily News stated that "it rocks consistently ... without resorting too often to overripe electropop cliche."

The Sacramento Bee thought the album to be "buoyed by some tasty syncopated rhythms." The Philadelphia Inquirer determined that "filled with quick, clever rock songs, it can stand with the best of his work, and it never sounds as if Twilley has become bitter or tired."

== Track listing ==
1. "Little Bit of Love" – 3:48
2. "Girls" – 3:28
3. "Why You Wanna Break My Heart" – 3:45
4. "You Can Change It" – 3:04
5. "Cry Baby" – 3:41
6. "Don't You Love Her" – 3:44
7. "Long Lonely Nights" – 3:58
8. "Jungle" – 4:36
9. "To Get to You" 3:43
10. "Max Dog" – 1:41
