= Holiday (America album) =

Studio album by America
- Released: June 26, 1974
- Recorded: April 17 - May 7, 1974
- Studios: AIR, London
- Genres: Folk rock; pop rock
- Length: 33:21
- Label: Warner Bros.
- Producer: George Martin

America chronology
Hat Trick (1973)	Holiday (1974)	Hearts (1975)

Singles from Holiday
- 1. "Tin Man" Released: August 1974; 2. "Lonely People" Released: December 1974

Holiday is the fourth studio album by the American folk rock band America, released on the Warner Bros. Records label in June 1974. The album was produced in London by George Martin, the first of six consecutive studio albums he produced for America.

The album was a big hit in the US, reaching number 3 on the Billboard album chart and being certified gold by the RIAA. It produced two hit singles: "Tin Man", which reached number 4 on the Billboard singles chart and went to number 1 on the adult contemporary chart, and "Lonely People", which peaked at number 5 on the Billboard singles chart and also hit number 1 on the adult contemporary chart. Several other songs received radio airplay on FM stations playing album tracks, including "Baby It's Up To You" and "Another Try". The album was also released on Quadrophonic reel-to-reel tape.

== History ==
Band member Dewey Bunnell was thrilled at the prospect of working with George Martin as producer. He was quoted as saying that it "was great working with George. It was like we knew each other. We were familiar with the Beatles, of course, and we had that British sense of humor." In a separate interview, Dan Peek recalled to Circus magazine: "Gerry (Beckley) had been in England, and we'd talked about using George Martin as our producer. He's such a hot arranger, thinking about all the stuff he's done. There were several other people we wanted to use, but that idea sort of flashed and George was available."

Holiday was the recording debut of America's longtime drummer Willie Leacox, who is in the car in the cover photo.

== Reception ==
Professional ratings
Review scores
Source	Rating
AllMusic	3.5/5 stars
The Rolling Stone Album Guide	2/5 stars

In his AllMusic review music critic Mike DeGagne noted the effect of George Martin's production on the album as well as the rebound from the failure of Hat Trick, writing "this album as a whole ascertained that the group was definitely showing their true potential once more."

== Track listing ==
No.	Title	Writer(s)	Length
1.	"Miniature"	Gerry Beckley	1:12
2.	"Tin Man"	Dewey Bunnell	3:27
3.	"Another Try"	Beckley	3:16
4.	"Lonely People"	Dan Peek, Catherine Peek	2:27
5.	"Glad to See You"	D. Peek	3:42
6.	"Mad Dog"	Beckley	2:39
7.	"Hollywood"	Bunnell	2:49
8.	"Baby It's Up to You"	Beckley	2:24
9.	"You"	D. Peek	2:25
10.	"Old Man Took"	Bunnell	3:10
11.	"What Does It Matter"	Beckley	2:18
12.	"In the Country"	D. Peek	2:58

== Personnel ==
America

- Dewey Bunnell – vocals, guitars
- Gerry Beckley – vocals, guitars, keyboards, bass
- Dan Peek – vocals, bass, guitars, keyboards

with:

- Willie Leacox – drums, percussion

Technical

- George Martin – producer, arranger, keyboards
- Geoff Emerick – engineering
- Peter Henderson – tape operator
- Gary Burden – art direction

== Charts ==
=== Weekly charts ===
Chart (1974)	Peak position
Australian Albums (Kent Music Report)	25
Canada Top Albums/CDs (RPM)	3
US Billboard 200	3

=== Year-end charts ===
Chart (1974)	Position
Canada Top Albums/CDs (RPM)	34
Chart (1975)	Position
US Billboard 200	55

== Certifications ==
Region	Certification	Certified units/sales
United Kingdom (BPI)	Silver	60,000^{^}
United States (RIAA)	Gold	500,000^{^}
^{^} Shipments figures based on certification alone.
