= Willis Alan Ramsey =

American singer-songwriter

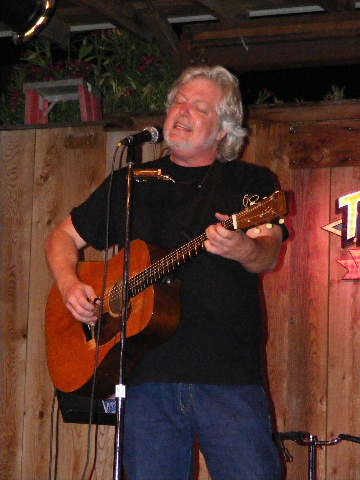
- Ramsey performing in Austin, Texas in 2008

Background information
- Born: March 5, 1951 (age 74); Birmingham, Alabama

Willis Alan Ramsey (born 5 March 1951) is an American singer/songwriter, a cult legend among fans of Americana and Texas country. He was born in Birmingham, Alabama, and raised in Dallas, Texas. Ramsey graduated from Highland Park High School in 1969, and was a prominent baritone in the school's Lads and Lassies Choir. In his senior year, he played a leading role in the musical Carousel. He released the critically acclaimed album Willis Alan Ramsey in 1972 on the Shelter label. The album included "Muskrat Candlelight" which was covered (under the title "Muskrat Love") by America in 1973 and by Captain & Tennille in 1976.

Owing to conflict with his label, Ramsey left Shelter at the end of his contract. As a result, Ramsey's fans have been waiting half a century for the release of his "mythical second album". When asked where the new album is, he often responds, "What's wrong with the first one?"

In the 1980s, he moved to Great Britain to reconnect with his ancestry and study traditional and modern music narrative. At the same time, he enjoyed a revival in the United States, due in part to numerous artists who cut versions of Ramsey's songs, including Widespread Panic ("Geraldine & The Honey Bee"), Jerry Jeff Walker ("Northeast Texas Women"), Waylon Jennings, Shawn Colvin ("Satin Sheets"), Jimmy Buffett ("The Ballad of Spider John"), and Jimmie Dale Gilmore ("Goodbye to Old Missoula"). In 1989, he returned to the United States and began performing again.

In 2000, Ramsey appeared on Austin City Limits, showcasing his new material and performing his classics. He is currently mixing his new album, Gentilly, so-called since 1997. Gentilly is planned to be an independent release, financed by friends and fans mostly from the Dallas and Austin area. Co-produced by Ramsey, Alison Rogers and Jamie Oldaker, guest musicians include Oldaker (drums, percussion); Sam Bush & Tim O'Brien (mandolin, vocals); Viktor Krauss, Roscoe Beck & Freebo (bass); Bruce Bouton (steel guitar); Mickey Raphael (harmonica); Walt Richmond (piano, organ); Joel Guzman (accordion); Marcia Ball, Tommy Malone, Abra Moore & Alison Rogers (vocals). Ramsey, Rogers, and Everett Moran are engineering.
