= Shelter Records =

American record label

- Founded: 1969; 57 years ago
- Founder: Leon Russell; Denny Cordell
- Defunct: 1981; 45 years ago
- Status: Defunct
- Distributors: Blue Thumb Records and Capitol Records
- Genre: Blues, country, tulsa sound, swamp pop, rock
- Country of origin: United States
- Location: Tulsa, Oklahoma and Los Angeles

Shelter Records was a U.S. record label started by Leon Russell and Denny Cordell that operated from 1969 to 1981. The company established offices in both Los Angeles and Tulsa, Russell's home town, where the label sought to promote a "workshop atmosphere" with a recording studio in a converted church, adjoining houses for artists working at the studio, and other facilities. The Tulsa recording studio was housed in the historic The Church Studio. Russell remained with Shelter until 1976, when he and Cordell fell out. In a settlement, Cordell then became sole owner of the label, while Russell left to start his own label, Paradise Records.

The Shelter Records trademark is owned by Teresa Knox of The Church Studio.

In addition to Russell, the label signed other talents, such as Tulsa Sound artists J. J. Cale, Dwight Twilley Band and the Gap Band, as well as Alan Gerber, Jesse Barish (of Jesse, Wolff and Whings), Don Nix, Freddie King, Tom Petty & the Heartbreakers, Phoebe Snow, Richard Torrance and Eureka, Willis Alan Ramsey, and the Grease Band.

Shelter Records also released "Duppy Conqueror", the first American single by reggae artist Bob Marley.

== Distribution history ==
Shelter Records was originally distributed by Blue Thumb Records, but then it was distributed by Capitol/EMI from 1970 until 1973. During this time, the label was red with an egg on top with an inverted Superman logo on the egg. This logo did not sit well with DC Comics, and they sued Shelter for trademark infringement. Shelter then blacked out the Superman logo on subsequent releases until the distribution deal ran out with Capitol/EMI. Afterwards, the Shelter logo was replaced by an egg with a hand-scrawled "S" on it.

From 1974 until 1975 (sporting a yellowish label and their new logo), Shelter was then distributed by MCA Records. Afterwards from 1975 to 1977, the label was distributed by ABC Records (the first label being yellow; the second one was reddish-orange with the Shelter egg inside a Saturn-style ring with a crescent Man in the Moon at the bottom of the label). In 1977, Shelter transferred distribution to Arista (principally for the Dwight Twilley Band), but the rights to Tom Petty and J. J. Cale were retained by ABC. Shelter continued as an active label until 1979, when ABC was sold to MCA. MCA released one more album using the Shelter label (a J.J. Cale album), then all remaining Shelter recordings held by ABC were put on another MCA subsidiary entitled Backstreet Records. The Shelter/Arista deal terminated in 1981, which was the effective end of Shelter Records. Shortly after the label's demise, the catalog was purchased by Dunhill Compact Classics (later known as DCC), which reissued several Shelter catalog LPs and compilations. DCC (which issued mostly compilation CDs mostly licensed from other labels, many remastered by respected recording engineer Steve Hoffman) later went out of business.

In 1991, the Shelter music publishing catalog was sold to Rondor Music. During 1993, the Shelter catalogue was bought out by Capitol/EMI, and their imprint The Right Stuff reissued many titles (except for Tom Petty and J. J. Cale albums, as the Tom Petty Shelter albums are controlled by Petty's estate and currently distributed by Rhino, owned by the Warner Music Group, also owners of Petty's former label Reprise Records, and the J. J. Cale Shelter albums are controlled by Universal Music Group, the successor to MCA).

In the United Kingdom, records on the Shelter label were distributed by Island Records in the late 1970s.

== See also ==
- The Right Stuff Records
- Takoma Records
- Swamp pop
- Blues
- Country
- Willis Alan Ramsey (album)
- Claudia Lennear
