= List of Good Witch episodes =

Good Witch is an American/Canadian fantasy comedy-drama television series, based on the made-for-TV movie series of the same name, that aired on the Hallmark Channel. The series centered around the spirited life of Cassie Nightingale (Catherine Bell), her teenage daughter Grace (Bailee Madison) and their neighbors, the Radfords – Sam (James Denton) and his teenage son, Nick (Rhys Matthew Bond), as well as the various residents of Middleton USA, some of whom believed Cassie is a witch.

The series premiered on February 28, 2015, and was renewed for seven consecutive seasons. On July 9, 2021, it was announced that the seventh season would be the series' last. During the course of the series, 75 episodes of Good Witch aired, concluding on July 25, 2021. The series is available to watch on YouTube, Vudu, Amazon Instant Video and Google Play.

== Series overview ==
Season	Episodes	Originally released	
Season	Episodes	First released	Last released
1	10	February 28, 2015	April 18, 2015
Halloween		October 24, 2015	
2	10	April 17, 2016	June 19, 2016
Secrets of Grey House		October 22, 2016	
3	10	April 30, 2017	July 2, 2017
Spellbound		October 22, 2017	
4	10	April 29, 2018	July 1, 2018
Tale of Two Hearts		October 21, 2018	
5	10	June 9, 2019	August 18, 2019
Curse from a Rose		October 19, 2019	
6	10	May 3, 2020	July 5, 2020
7	10	May 16, 2021	July 25, 2021

== Episodes ==
=== Season 1 (2015) ===
No. overall	No. in season	Title	Directed by	Written by	Length	Original release date	Prod. code	U.S. viewers (millions)
1–2	1–2	"Starting Over...Again" "Apologies and Remembrances"	Craig Pryce	Story by : Sue Tenney; Teleplay by : Bruce Graham	120 minutes	February 28, 2015	264294-1; 264294-2	2.91
After the death of her husband, Cassie Nightingale and her family find themselves caring for her ailing father-in-law. Moving in next door are the Radfords, Sam and Nick. Sam, the town's new doctor, has difficulty getting patients, as the town goes to Cassie's store for her more earthly herbal remedies.
3	3	"Running Scared"	Laurie Lynd	Story by : Sue Tenney; Teleplay by : Bruce Graham	60 minutes	March 7, 2015	264294-9	2.01
Ashley, a troubled young woman, shows up at Grey House looking for a place to stay. Next door, after Nick's trouble at school, and Sam attempts to discipline him without pushing him away. After being caught between them, Grace tries to avoid Nick, but soon finds herself a pawn in another one of his lies now involving her best friend Anthony. Using intuition and some of Cassie's advice, Grace plans to expose Nick's lie to Sam, who must finally improve his family's relationship. Meanwhile, Middleton prepares for the annual Heritage Festival, including a 10K race and grand ball. Bistro owner, Stephanie, hopes to spark a romantic connection and a date to the dance with Sam. Then, as a suspicious Brandon is eager to investigate Ashley's background, one of Cassie's coincidences draws Ashley and Derek together. A stranger comes to Cassie claiming to know Ashley and reveals a long-kept secret. Cassie is caught in Ashley's lies and Middleton's new mystery.
4	4	"Do the Right Thing"	Laurie Lynd	Story by : Sue Tenney; Teleplay by : Bruce Graham	60 minutes	March 14, 2015	264294-8	1.99
The Middleton police attempt to track down a missing Ashley, but it is Cassie who might know where to find her and how to change her direction. Meanwhile, the town is excited about the Heritage Ball at the Grey House. A confrontation on the dance floor arises when Ryan's ex-fiancée shows up.
5	5	"All in the Family"	Craig Pryce	Story by : Sue Tenney; Teleplay by : Bruce Graham	60 minutes	March 21, 2015	264294-7	1.95
Cassie's cousin Abigail arrives in Middleton. Sam hires her to be his receptionist, despite Stephanie wanting the job to get closer to him. Abigail influences Grace's rebelliousness, often taking her side on several issues with Cassie, who states being the only one left to set limits for Grace. Anthony and Grace plan to team up on a history project, but she later disappears.
6	6	"The Truth About Lies"	Craig Pryce	Story by : Sue Tenney; Teleplay by : Bruce Graham	60 minutes	March 28, 2015	264294-6	2.16
Grace returns home, accompanied by Nick, who escorted her, and lies about being at the library. Martha plans to re-develop Middleton, in order to improve her chances of running for governor. However, Ryan decides to take his business to Blairsville. Abigail offers to help Sam cook dinner for his date with Stephanie, but, when Abigail doesn't show, Cassie saves his dinner plans. Lori researches Abigail's past to learn she was being truthful about her life in New York City. Sam and Nick begin working on their damaged relationship.
7	7	"The Storm"	Don McBrearty	Story by : Sue Tenney; Teleplay by : Bruce Graham	60 minutes	April 4, 2015	264294-5	1.81
When a blizzard threatens disaster in Middleton, Cassie must convince Sam to follow her intuition in order to help a young couple survive the storm. Brandon becomes involved in a crash and Abigail helps Stephanie after she takes a fall inside the Bistro. Grace, Anthony, and Nick get trapped inside the library.
8	8	"Together We Stand..."	Don McBrearty	Story by : Sue Tenney; Teleplay by : Bruce Graham	60 minutes	April 11, 2015	264294-4	1.92
The storm continues to threaten in citizens of Middleton. Cassie and Sam work together to save a young man's life. Anthony, Grace, & Nick continue to wait out the storm in the library. Derek later takes them home. Nick's mother, Linda, arrives at Grey House.
9–10	9–10	"Homecoming" "True Colors"	Craig Pryce	Story by : Sue Tenney; Teleplay by : Bruce Graham	120 minutes	April 18, 2015	264294-2; 264294-10	2.25
Cassie receives a letter her shop could be shut down after a greedy developer bought her building. Ryan could be to blame. Next door, Sam confronts his ex-wife Linda (Gabrielle Miller) as she threatens to sue for custody of Nick. Struggling to do what's best for Nick, Sam looks for Cassie's guidance, leading them to find comfort in each other's company. Likewise, Nick talks to Grace about his parents' stalemate, and her own insight helps her to see what Nick might not be ready to admit. Then, Brandon's wife Tara (Ashley Leggat) returns to Middleton, and the two must decide how to move forward in their marriage. When Tara surprises him with an overseas opportunity, Brandon is torn between needing to be with his wife and honoring his late father's wishes to look after a distraught Cassie possibly losing the shop. However, Cassie conjures up a plan to bring the two back together, and when a guilty Ryan attempts to save the Bell, Book, & Candle, he finds that her charm has always been at work. As Cassie considers the future of their romance, she finds her feelings for Sam turning into more than friendship, just as Grace and Martha conspire to bring all of Middleton together in hopes of saving the Bell, Book, & Candle.

=== Special (2015) ===
No.	Title	Directed by	Written by	Length	Original release date	Prod. code	U.S. viewers (millions)
11	"Good Witch Halloween" "Something Wicked"	Craig Pryce	Sue Tenney & Amy Palmer Robertson	120 minutes	October 24, 2015	264294-11; 264294-12	2.68
As Middleton prepares for its annual Halloween Fall Festival, Cassie's neighbor Sam volunteers to set up a hay maze for it, hoping to bond with his son Nick. While Cassie tries to bring them closer together, she struggles to get her own family – daughter Grace, step-children Brandon and Lori and cousin Abigail – together to transform the Grey House into the town's most popular haunted attraction, under the watchful eye of Mayor Martha. Abigail is too busy campaigning against Stephanie in a heated competition for festival queen. Grace is being bullied at school as rumors circulate that she is a witch, prompting her to beg Cassie to put an end to their annual tradition. As Cassie welcomes a secretive stranger, Joseph, to the Grey House, she soon finds her intuition is no match for whatever is causing trouble for her family. While Brandon and Lori investigate Joseph's past, Cassie discovers a deeper connection that could put the whole community in danger.

=== Season 2 (2016) ===
No. overall	No. in season	Title	Directed by	Written by	Original release date	Prod. code	U.S. viewers (millions)
12	1	"Second Time Around"	Craig Pryce	Sue Tenney	April 17, 2016	264294-13	2.19
Cassie and Sam seem ready to move their relationship forward, but Sam's ex-wife, Linda (Gabrielle Miller), wishes to repair their fractured family for Nick's sake. Grace is nervous about her first driving test. She searches for the perfect teacher to help ace her test. Cassie hangs a help-wanted sign at Bell, Book & Candle. At the Bistro, Abigail approaches Stephanie with a business proposition, before scheming a startling betrayal. A seemingly happy couple arrives at Grey House to celebrate their upcoming nuptials, but Cassie sees beyond their façade, which leads to a confession. Elsewhere, Tara and Brandon have a difference of opinion on an important milestone, which could affect their future; and an intriguing visitor from Cassie's past arrives in Middleton.
13	2	"Driven"	Craig Pryce	Sue Tenney	April 24, 2016	264294-14	1.96
Cassie is surprised to learn her old college friend John (Dan Payne) has arrived in Middleton for a teaching job, but, as they reminisce, it seems John may have an ulterior motive behind his move to town. Meanwhile, Grace believes that Sam is the perfect person to help her master her driving skills before the road test. However, manipulative Linda is determined to keep Cassie and her family away, considering them as competition for Sam's attention. Cassie plans a fresh and honest start for her heartbroken Grey House guests, before helping her new shop assistant to follow her true passion. As Brandon and Tara come to an impasse after their pregnancy false alarm, Martha is forced to go silent to cure her laryngitis, which may be a gift unto itself. Abigail charms her way into a surprising solo business plan, as Stephanie is angry until she discovers the truth behind Abigail's betrayal. Lastly, just as Sam stands up to Linda to keep Cassie in his life, Cassie's rekindled friendship with John appears to head down a romantic path.
14	3	"Out of the Past"	Cal Coons	Sue Tenney & Jed Seidel	May 1, 2016	264294-15	1.97
Cassie is unnerved when John looks in her past, just as Ryan returns to Middleton with unfinished business. While Cassie attempts to keep both men from hindering her friendship with Sam, he still contends with Linda about what's best for Nick, who starts to see cracks in his parents' forced truce. Meanwhile, Grace postpones her driving test before her last road lesson, prompting Sam to question her motives. Abigail's new flower shop flourishes, despite her noticeable hands-off approach. When Abigail's overworked assistant becomes exasperated, Cassie senses her cousin is about to get her first real business lesson just as the town's number-one customer, Martha, is relying on her. At the bistro, Stephanie gets a surprise visit from her overbearing mother Betty (Sherry Miller), but decides to keep her new romance with Ben a secret, against Cassie's advice, which quickly unravels. At the same time, Martha is visited by her son, Michael. Cassie later meets with Ryan to put the past behind them, but suddenly finds herself questioning if she is ready for a new romance with anyone.
15	4	"The Trouble with Love"	Cal Coons	Amy Palmer Robertson & Jed Seidel	May 8, 2016	264294-16	1.92
Cassie feels helpless when Grace admits to spending time with Sam because she's hurting from the loss of her father. Cassie turns to Sam for support, but John asks her to attend a university gala as his date. Meanwhile, Linda officially moves into Sam's house and quickly makes Nick miserable with her controlling ways. Abigail desperately searches for a new assistant at her shop to help finish Martha's large flower order. Abigail tries a shortcut to solve her problem but ultimately gets some help and hope from Cassie that gives her the push she needs to do things right. Cassie also gives Linda some intuition on Nick's true feelings, as Sam helps Grace heal her heart with an opportunity at his medical practice, showing he actually cares for Cassie and her family. While Linda makes a decision about her future in Middleton, Cassie learns the truth about John's long-distance girlfriend and the romantic dilemma deepens.
16	5	"Surprise Me"	Don McCutcheon	Amy Palmer Robertson	May 15, 2016	264294-17	2.01
A new Grey House guest, Alexis (Meghan Heffern), checks in and quickly exhausts George and Cassie with her high-maintenance demands. While Cassie predicts there is more to the story behind Alexis's spoiled façade, Grace begins her medical internship at Sam's office. She enthusiastically takes on her new job responsibilities with ease, quickly making receptionist Eve (Kate Corbett) feel intimidated. At the same time, Sam asks Nick to find a new extracurricular activity at school, but, when Nick finally picks something he is passionate about, it isn't quite what Sam had in mind. At the bistro, Stephanie is still reeling from her breakup with Ben, who seems to be moving on. Cassie introduces her to a handsome attorney who seems almost too perfect – proving Cassie's plan isn't complete. Brandon looks for means to quell Tara's need to have a baby. After Cassie joins John to relive part of their past, Sam plans an unpredictable yet perfect first date, leaving Cassie surprised by her own increasingly complicated feelings.
17	6	"Risk"	Don McCutcheon	Sue Tenney & Jackson Rock	May 22, 2016	264294-18	2.19
Cassie goes on a horseback-riding date with Sam, but John's exciting news keeps her caught between the two men's affections. At Grey House, guest Alexis finally admits to Cassie about her financial falling out from her father but promises to settle her bill. Cassie knows Alexis will follow through, despite George and Abigail suggesting harsher punishment. Eve fears Grace will replace her as Sam's receptionist, but Grace puts a plan in motion to help restore Eve's confidence. Meanwhile, Sam worries Nick isn't ready to study abroad but an important job offer could make him reconsider. Stephanie receives an opportunity to move on from her heartbreak, only she realizes she deserves a second chance with Ben. As Cassie devises a plan to help Brandon and Tara agree on a change for their future, she gives Martha insight on helping her son. However, after Cassie agrees to assist John with a new project at his university, she realizes their connection could impede her growing feelings for Sam. She must decide if that is a risk worth taking.
18	7	"What's Your Secret?"	Laurie Lynd	Amy Palmer Robertson	May 29, 2016	264294-19	2.05
Cassie agrees to plan a surprise anniversary party for Martha and her husband Tom (Paul Miller), as long as the people of Middleton can keep a secret. Cassie enlists Stephanie to cater the event and Abigail begins arranging the flowers, as Martha is adamant to learn what everyone is plotting. Meanwhile, Sam declines the hospital's generous job offer, deciding time with Nick is more important. The hospital sends an attractive recruiter to persuade him, and Sam finds his decision more difficult. Cassie reassures him he is going in the right direction, as he considers buying a lakeside retreat to spend more time with his son and, possibly, Cassie as well. Grace feels friendless after she realizes Nick is serious about London and tries to make him stay. When a Grey House guest claims a ghost is haunting his room, Cassie knows a deeper problem lurks and promises he can trust her to solve it. Just as a big secret slips, John arrives to convince her to go on another wild adventure, and she discovers her life is still full of the unexpected.
19	8	"Truth"	Laurie Lynd	Sue Tenney	June 5, 2016	264294-20	2.21
Following an exhilarating date in the mountains with John, Cassie wonders if it is too late to chase old dreams. At the same time, she offers Sam advice to help him make two important decisions in his life. As he weighs his options, his expertise is needed with Grey House guest Dan (Riley Gilchrist), who claims to be seeing spirits, and the medical mystery could lead Sam to all the answers he is looking for. Meanwhile, Grace meets a new friend at school and devises a plan to help Nick reconsider his London trip. After Abigail creates a story to cover her accidental slip about Martha's surprise anniversary party, her little lie quickly becomes a rumor that puts Cassie's love life in question. As the party nears, Martha becomes increasingly suspicious. However, Cassie keeps the mayor distracted by helping her plan a surprise of her own for Tom. Cassie knowingly sends Stephanie on a path that helps her make a clear decision about the future of her catering business. Just as the anniversary party brings together all of Middleton for a grand celebration of love, Cassie receives an unexpected opportunity from John that could change her life. She must decide if what she really wants is right at home.
20	9	"A Perfect Match, Part 1"	Craig Pryce	Amy Palmer Robertson	June 12, 2016	264294-21	2.12
The people of Middleton are in final preparations for the annual Lights Festival, just as Cassie and Sam see sparks fly between them at his new lake house. However, John pressures her to join him on his adventure in the Maldives, and her future remains in question. Meanwhile, after Sam finally gives Nick permission to go to London, Grace senses her friend is having second thoughts about leaving his dad, but her plan to help him could backfire. At the bistro, Cassie helps Stephanie discover Ben's true feelings about commitment, while back at her shop, Cassie's instincts lead her to give a conflicted Tara a new beginning. Abigail volunteers to take over as the official festival planner, but doubts soon circulate about whether she is up to the job or up to something else. Also, just as Cassie and Sam decide to let their kids in on a secret, they find their big revelation may have already come to light.
21	10	"A Perfect Match, Part 2"	Craig Pryce	Story by : Sue Tenney; Teleplay by : Sue Tenney & Jackson Rock	June 19, 2016	264294-22	2.30
A dispute about London between Nick and Grace causes Cassie to slow things down with Sam. However, she does tell him that she is not going to join John in the Maldives. While weighing her future options, she explains to Grace about missing her father but loving someone new. Grace knows, after previously seeing Cassie and Sam kiss. Cassie also has Grace to deliver a letter to John at the festival. The letter is in Sanskrit, which Nick notices and talks with John about students helping him in the Maldives. Abigail's behavior was a ruse to force Martha into becoming more involved in the magical festival that brings the town together, except for Sam who has yet to arrive.

=== Special (2016) ===
No.	Title	Directed by	Written by	Length	Original release date	Prod. code	U.S. viewers (millions)
22	"Good Witch: Secrets of Grey House" "The Enchantress Unites"	Craig Pryce	Dean Batali	120 minutes	October 22, 2016	264294-23; 264294-34	2.24
Sam fails to keep his date with Cassie at the Lights Festival, but his absence was due to a patient dying on the operating table. The experience weighs heavily on him, and Cassie offers support while giving him needed space. Meanwhile, she welcomes popular fantasy author Jessica Carrington and her editor Sean (Jeff Roop) to Grey House. Before long, Cassie inspires her to hold the launch party for her latest book in Middleton, which shares mysterious and surprising similarities with her stories. Middleton begins to transform into the book's Halloween-themed setting of Tarynsville, with the effort led by Mayor Tinsdale to ensure the town impresses. When the event is threatened, Cassie must devise a plan to save the day; and intriguing information about Grey House and Middleton's past arises. Also, Cassie helps Jessica and Sean discover their long-simmering love for each other. Trying to keep his mind off his patient's death, Sam immerses himself in work at the hospital. When Grace arrives at the emergency room after a rock-climbing accident – a sudden adventure inspired by her new friend Courtney, the crisis brings Sam and Cassie closer together and helps her realize her feelings for him.

=== Season 3 (2017) ===
No. overall	No. in season	Title	Directed by	Written by	Original release date	Prod. code	U.S. viewers (millions)
23	1	"A Budding Romance"	Michael Kennedy	Dean Batali	April 30, 2017	264294-24	2.14
Cassie and the residents of Middleton anticipate the blossoming of the rare Middleton Merriwick plant for the first time in decades. Martha plans to publicize that the town houses the rarity, by escorting a curious botanist from the university to the botanical gardens to study its wonder. George accidentally reveals Sam and Cassie's pseudo-secret that they are officially together, causing Grace to feel hurt as she wasn't told first. A cryptic text from Nick leads Grace to think he plans to ask her out, but she worries that this could complicate their friendship. Later in the botanical gardens, it is discovered someone cut a stalk off the Merriwick and it seems its decline affects the ladies in town.
24	2	"Without Magic for a Spell"	Michael Kennedy	Dawn DeKeyser	May 7, 2017	264294-25	2.11
Not feeling like herself, Cassie closes her store for a few days. Martha begins investigating the Merriwick culprit and worries it won't bloom in time to feature the plant and Middleton in the state tourism book. Meanwhile, a former colleague of Abigail's makes a surprise visit, and she starts to question his intentions when it becomes evident he has ulterior motives. Ben discusses with Stephanie a unique investment opportunity he is considering, but, after realizing it is beyond his financial means, she helps him consider an alternative solution. Inside the botanical gardens, Sam realizes Cassie and the Merriwick are connected and shares with Martha that he believes in Cassie. Following a strange turn of events, Derek uncovers the culprit, while the town eagerly waits to see what the mystical Merriwick will do next.
25	3	"Day After Day"	Craig Pryce	Skander Halim	May 14, 2017	264294-26	1.88
Cassie welcomes Grey House guests Jim (Morgan Kelly) and Annabel (Tara Yelland), who are in town for the same job interview and immediately clash. Despite their constant bickering, Cassie senses they could be right for each other and turns their one-night stay into several. Suddenly, every day in Middleton is just like the one that came before and everyone is feeling the impact. Sam tries to plan the perfect date for Cassie but various roadblocks repeatedly thwart his attempts and their romantic evening never fully happens. When Grace finally takes a test that keeps getting delayed, she learns a valuable lesson when she receives her grade. Meanwhile, Abigail is swamped with daily deliveries of flowers that she never ordered for her shop and cannot seem to stop them from coming. These repetitious days ultimately bring about some important revelations that allow time to finally resume.
26	4	"How to Say, "I Love You!""	Craig Pryce	Bill Fuller	May 21, 2017	264294-27	1.78
Cassie and Sam reminisce about the day they met, and he shares how happy he is with her. He later finds constant reminders about saying "I love you" to that special someone, which is something he can't bring himself to do. Meanwhile, Ben renovates the iconic and historic Middleton Theatre for its grand re-opening, and Stephanie offers to make the concessions but gets a little carried away. Martha must approve multiple city projects, only to learn that the account is empty. Grace makes a surprising discovery that allows Martha to keep her promises. As Cassie and Grace clean out the attic in Grey House, they uncover a long-forgotten box filled with old film canisters, including a 1930s-era romantic comedy, titled How to Say, "I Love You!", that becomes the feature film for the theatre's grand re-opening. The movie clearly affects Sam, as he glances at Cassie throughout and holds her hand tightly. Afterwards, he admits to her that he enjoyed it more than he thought, shares a loving kiss with her, and, finally, tells her that he loves her.
27	5	"A Birthday Wish"	Phillip Earnshaw	Sheryl A. Anderson	May 28, 2017	264294-28	1.98
Cassie wants to make Grace's upcoming milestone birthday the best of all and presents her with the Merriwick Wish Book, passed down for hundreds of years to every Merriwick girl when she turns a certain age, to write down her deepest wish for it to come true. Abigail shares with Grace her own birthday wish, along with the disappointment that came with wishing for something trivial, and reveals the heart-breaking reason why Cassie's page in the book is blank. Grace's friends, Nick and Courtney, whisk her away for a day of celebration, but she longs to spend time with Cassie. At the end of the fun-filled day, mother and daughter finally enjoy cake and ice cream. Grace gives Cassie an unexpected and touching gift. Cassie then takes a faded envelope out of an old jewelry box and reads her wish that she had made on her special birthday: "a life filled with love". Grace pastes Cassie's wish on the blank page, and then, after pasting her own, shares with her mom her special birthday wish, and the only thing she truly wanted: "the perfect moment" with just the two of them.
28	6	"Say it with Candy"	Phillip Earnshaw	Dawn DeKeyser	June 4, 2017	264294-29	2.20
Cassie's ability for helping people find exactly what they need charms her customers. Abigail notices this and, with slight jealousy, feels overlooked and invisible. Taking some of Cassie's advice, she devises a plan to sell chocolates with her own flair and offer Cassie-like words of comfort and advice with each box, hoping to replicate the same success. Abigail's frazzled customers begin to see surprising results with their problems, and sales rapidly increase. However, the demand for her chocolates exhausts her. Grace shows her that listening, offering advice, and caring for each customer, as Cassie does, is what helps them find exactly what they need. Meanwhile, Sam's New York friend, Liam, settles in Middleton with his teenage son Noah. Sam is excited for Nick to have an old friend around but is puzzled by his son's lack of enthusiasm for Noah's return. At a welcome dinner planned by Cassie and Grace, Nick reveals that his disdain for Noah stems from an incident in their past.
29	7	"In Sickness and in Health"	Laurie Lynd	Dean Batali	June 11, 2017	264294-30	2.38
Grey House guest and artist Harrison Boyd (Michael Therriault) doesn't say much but lets his work do the talking. After Cassie offers for him to choose a unique paintbrush from her shop, the scenes he paints depict events with people close to her that haven't yet happened. As he begins a new painting, he is not sure what it will become nor do the faces take shape until the very end. Meanwhile, Grace is upset when a classmate is appointed the academic decathlon team captain since she was expecting to land the position herself. When the captain has a series of mishaps and unexplained memory lapses, Grace worries that she is somehow responsible. Martha asks Cassie to once again oversee Middleton's annual Healthfest. Cassie convinces Sam to help and, despite their different approaches, plans fall into place. In the process, they discover some of her customers and his patients suffer from the same illness, so the couple works together discover the commonality and find a solution. Later, as Harrison readies to depart Grey House, he leaves behind one painting as a gift, surprising everyone as those depicted are hardly doing anything at all. When Cassie takes a closer look, she notices several significant details that cause concern about what it might mean for each person's future.
30	8	"Somewhat Surprising"	Laurie Lynd	Dean Batali	June 18, 2017	264294-31	2.09
On the one-year anniversary of the Radfords' move to Middleton, Cassie wants to honor the occasion. Martha excitedly insists on a surprise party for Sam, and, when those plans quickly escalate into an extravagance Sam wouldn't want, Cassie designs the perfect way to celebrate. Intuitively believing people want to remember things from their past, she learns Sam cherished a 1967 Chevrolet Camaro during medical school and asks Officer Sanders (Noah Cappe) to help remind Sam of his treasured car. At Grey House, an old coat belonging to Abigail's father is discovered, prompting her to reminisce about the last time she saw him as a young girl and how he brought her gifts from his overseas travels to let her know he was thinking of her. A man claiming to be from the U.S. Postal Service delivers her a package sent from out of the country that was lost for 20 years. Grace's interest in Noah grows but she is frustrated by Nick's constant interruptions. She decides to help the two reconcile, hoping it will clear the way for her to spend more time with Noah. Later, Cassie invites Sam over, and he expects to walk into a party; however, she is alone and gives him a special gift to remind him of the Camaro he loved. He admits he wouldn't have minded a party, and she leads him to one while reminding him of how many people in his life love him. He realizes he got exactly what he wanted.
31	9	"Not Getting Married Today, Part 1"	Craig Pryce	Sean Alexander & Sarah Larsen	June 25, 2017	264294-32	2.39
Martha's son is now engaged, so a Middleton wedding is in the works. The mother of the bride, Elizabeth (Allison Hossack), arrives in town, decides Martha's plans aren't elegant enough, and takes over, leaving Martha feeling left out and dejected. Meanwhile, Sam's globetrotting sister Joanne visits. After seeing how loving he is toward Cassie, she is surprised to learn he hasn't changed his mind about not remarrying. At Grey House, Cassie welcomes new adoptive parents and daughter Pavla as guests. After Abigail watches the young girl struggle to accept them, she shares with Pavla her own difficulty dealing with the sudden absence of her father. After confessing to Cassie she feels like she doesn't make a difference to anyone, Abigail helps bring Pavla closer to her new parents and discovers how valued she is to others. Later, during the final walkthrough at the wedding venue, Elizabeth decides none of what has been planned is good enough and calls in her vendors from the city instead of using Middleton's own. In the wake of this abrupt about-face, Cassie and Joanne reflect on how stressful wedding planning can be. Joanne mentions Sam's feelings towards marriage, quickly realizing this is news to Cassie. She tries to reassure Cassie that Sam does love her and leaves Cassie alone in her thoughts to take in this unexpected revelation.
32	10	"Not Getting Married Today, Part 2"	Craig Pryce	Dean Batali	July 2, 2017	264294-33	2.34
Unfocused and distracted with Joanne's info about Sam, Cassie goes to Chicago to visit her old friend and mentor, Olympia (Wendy Crewson). Meanwhile, in an effort to keep Sam from letting Cassie slip away, Joanne encourages her brother to focus on the good things in life instead of worrying about the bad things that could happen. After realizing his true feelings, he surprises Cassie in Chicago. As the two of them talk things through, she assures him that she is willing to live in each moment and see what comes. Back in Middleton, Vanessa and Michael's wedding plans have spiraled so far out of Elizabeth's control that the couple abruptly cancels the entire affair. After taking some time to reconsider, they decide to move ahead with something simple: a ceremony at City Hall the next day. Martha officiates and reads a touching passage that clearly affects the attendees, including Sam. Following the reception, he proposes to Cassie, and she accepts.

=== Special (2017) ===
No.	Title	Directed by	Written by	Length	Original release date	Prod. code	U.S. viewers (millions)
33	"Good Witch: Spellbound" "The Halloween Prophecy"	Craig Pryce	Dean Batali and Ron Osborn & Jeff Reno	120 minutes	October 22, 2017	264294-35; 264294-46	2.70
Cassie discovers an old photograph of former Middleton resident Cotton Perriwood, along with muslin sheets bearing the cryptic Perriwood prophecy. A mysterious stranger (Noam Jenkins) arrives just as bizarre events begin to occur in town as foretold in the prophecy. The fear that the curse Perriwood vowed as revenge for being driven out of town and kept from his true love is coming to life. At Cassie's party at Grey House on Halloween night, the last of the bizarre events occurs as predicted. Grace searches for the missing final page of the Perriwood prophecy, and Cassie must interpret the clues to figure out how to stop the curse and, along the way, discovers the future isn't always written exactly as it seems.

=== Season 4 (2018) ===
No. overall	No. in season	Title	Directed by	Written by	Original release date	Prod. code	U.S. viewers (millions)
34	1	"With This Ring"	Andy Mikita	Dean Batali	April 29, 2018	264294-36	2.30
Sam, now engaged to Cassie, visits the local jewelry store with Abigail to find the perfect engagement ring. He finds a most unique vintage ring, which unbeknownst to him is a Merriwick family heirloom. However, the ring is missing a piece, and the owner says the partial ring is not for sale. Abigail devises a plan to reconnect the past with the present with a truly selfless act, surprising herself and Sam. Meanwhile, Martha's attempt to boost tourism puts her on a quest to find the most romantic spot in Middleton; an old wedding album at Bell Book & Candle acts as an ancient map of sorts. With Abigail's help, the journey around town leads her to not only discover that romance is everywhere you look, but also to the exact place where more Merriwick women got engaged, which is not at all what she expected to find.
35	2	"In 4/4, With Emotion"	Andy Mikita	Skander Halim	May 6, 2018	264294-37	1.93
Handwritten sheet music of an old, original song is discovered hidden inside a piano bench at Grey House, and its tune seemingly follows Cassie and Sam around town. At the bistro, news of their engagement begins to spread. After seeing Cassie's beautiful ring, Stephanie reflects on her own recent breakup, prompting Abigail to scheme to get Stephanie noticed, which quickly unravels. Meanwhile, Cassie sees Nick and Grace's feigned truce start to crumble and arranges to have them work together. He has an opportunity to right a wrong, which helps put the past behind them. Sam offers Cassie several ideas for their upcoming wedding, but she is uneasy about voicing her opinion. After a reminder that a good marriage takes great communication, they agree to make plans together. Back at Grey House, Abigail answers a late-night knock on the door to find an unexpected and startling visitor on the other side.
36	3	"Daddy's Home"	Fred Gerber	Anthony Epling & Amy Van Curen	May 13, 2018	264294-38	1.83
Cassie welcomes a young, expecting couple to Grey House and helps them accept how their lives will change once their baby arrives. Abigail's father Arthur (Art Hindle), who walked out of her life 22 years ago, returns. When Cassie suggests compassion, Abigail is clearly struggling. She reluctantly agrees to meet Arthur for dinner, where he explains his long absence and wants to make amends. When Grace is unenthusiastic about winning another math competition, Sam challenges her to find her true passion. Meanwhile, Martha seeks to blend the past with the present to encourage women to be future small-business owners. Later, Abigail is notified from her bank's fraud department and is more convinced her father has ulterior motives. She confronts him and listens to what he has to say, realizing that life is about second chances and that she can have a future she never imagined.
37	4	"Family Time"	Fred Gerber	Dean Batali	May 20, 2018	264294-39	1.77
Cassie and Sam hope that bringing Grace and Nick for an overnight stay at the lake house will help the soon-to-be family to bond. Upon arrival, Cassie realizes that, despite her efforts, there are many distractions at the lake house. Nick finds himself in trouble, and Grace must decide if she wants to rescue him or snitch. While Cassie is away, Abigail is in charge of Grey House, and, after meddling in the love lives of guests, soon sees that Cassie's knack of making it a magical place is much harder than it seems. Meanwhile, Martha, Tara, and Brandon ponder the purpose of a mysterious box at Bell, Book & Candle, before a visitor reveals its surprising meaning, and it causes life-changing discoveries.
38	5	"Written Like a Merriwick"	T. W. Peacocke	Donna Thorland	May 27, 2018	264294-40	2.02
Cassie and Sam try to determine what is causing a mysterious medical issue suffered by one of her customers, combining Cassie's natural remedies and with Sam's scientific studies. Grace has writer's block on a school assignment, but an old trunk that arrives at Grey House with belongings from her ancestor, Elizabeth Merriwick, provides inspiration. Meanwhile, Stephanie seeks out a customer who left her bistro a bad review, which leads to a surprising culprit.
39	6	"Match Game"	T. W. Peacocke	Ron Osborn & Jeff Reno	June 3, 2018	264294-41	2.10
Grey House guest Phil Sturgis (Sebastian Pigott) creates a high-tech dating app, and Cassie discovers that his research identified two Middleton residents as perfect matches. She tries to bring the anonymous two together, getting help from Sam, who is concerned that one's questionnaire indicates a medical condition. Meanwhile, Abigail feels a connection with the app creator, but she is thwarted when he accuses her of stealing his idea. When she receives a clue from Martha, Abigail must find the real culprit, clear her name, and maybe even reignite their spark.
40	7	"Til Death Do Us Part"	Martin Wood	Dean Batali	June 10, 2018	264294-42	2.02
Cassie gives Sam a good luck charm for his trip to South America during a treacherous storm, but she still worries about losing him as she lost her late husband. Sam does face danger while providing medical help, but believes Cassie is watching over him. While working on Middleton's website, Grace discovers a discrepancy in Martha's esteemed family history and investigates to learn the surprising truth. Abigail shows Phil around town, and, as their romance blooms, he considers moving there. While waiting for Sam's return, Cassie helps Nick focus on his future and encourages him to fill out his college applications.
41	8	"All Dressed Up"	Martin Wood	Nicole Demerse	June 17, 2018	264294-43	1.97
Cassie tries to track down a long-lost wedding dress that once belonged to Elizabeth Merriwick; the special gown has been passed down from bride to bride. Grace plans to make a long-distance relationship work after Noah is accepted to college in New York, but, when she starts sacrificing major events in her life, she realizes their relationship may change after graduation. Meanwhile, Abigail speeds along a building permit process with Martha, hoping Phil will move his business to Middleton.
42	9	"How to Make a Middleton Quilt"	Rich Newey	Zoila Amelia Galeano & Bill Fuller	June 24, 2018	264294-44	2.12
The women in town make Cassie and Sam a wish quilt for their wedding, which, according to Middleton legend, grants wishes for anyone contributing a square. When wishes start coming true, Sam suspects Cassie might be behind it. Grace hosts a bachelorette party for Cassie, and Martha promises to find Cassie's wedding day "somethings." Proving wishes do come true, Cassie gets a surprise at her party. Meanwhile, Abigail looks for a house that she can officially call a home and tries to meet more people who share her love of Middleton.
43	10	"Tossing the Bouquet"	Rich Newey	Dean Batali	July 1, 2018	264294-45	2.20
Cassie and Sam's wedding is just days away. He begins moving into Grey House and adjusting to the difference between his quiet home and the bustling bed-and-breakfast. Grace and Nick prepare their wedding toasts, which unleashes some sibling rivalry. Meanwhile, Abigail joins the city council to solve a landscaping issue at her shop but gets more than she bargained for when Martha is unexpectedly removed from office. On their wedding day, Cassie convinces Sam to postpone their nuptials to allow a military wedding to occur.

=== Special (2018) ===
No.	Title	Directed by	Written by	Length	Original release date	Prod. code	U.S. viewers (millions)
44	"Good Witch: Tale of Two Hearts" "The Heart of Middleton"	Michael Kennedy	Darin Goldberg	120 minutes	October 21, 2018	264294-47; 264294-48	2.36
Cassie and Sam look forward to Middleton's bicentennial Halloween Harvest Festival, a competition with the rival town of Blairsville. Grace and Nick also realize that this is their last Halloween in Middleton before heading off to college. Abigail, as new mayor, tries to outdo Martha, whom she replaced, and creates rivalries within the town. When a 100-carat ruby, known as The Heart of Middleton, is stolen from the museum where the festival's gala is to be held, the town's Halloween romance suffers. Cassie suspects a Grey House guest is the culprit, but she believes it will all work out during the upcoming gala.

=== Season 5 (2019) ===
No. overall	No. in season	Title	Directed by	Written by	Original release date	Prod. code	U.S. viewers (millions)
45	1	"The Forever Tree, Part 1"	T. W. Peacocke	Vincent Pagano	June 9, 2019	264294-49	2.22
As Cassie works on last-minute wedding preparations, Sam looks for the tree that her ancestor was married under as a wedding surprise. Skeptical, he invites her world-traveling foster brother Vincent (Gianpaolo Venuta) along on the search. Grace is bothered by hiccups during wedding planning, and Nick finds inspiration for his future in a new girl. Abigail ponders restoring Martha as mayor, but a handsome stranger's arrival changes Abigail's plans. Meanwhile, Stephanie is smitten with a hospital chaplain.
46	2	"The Forever Tree, Part 2"	T. W. Peacocke	Darin Goldberg	June 10, 2019	264294-54	2.06
Cassie and Sam's wedding has finally arrived. As Middleton prepares for the event, Sam gets some help from Grace in finding the Forever Tree. However, the wedding causes Grace to miss her late father, while Cassie worries Vincent will not make it to the wedding. Abigail steps up into her mayoral duties and makes a surprising ally, while Martha finds a new passion in television. Meanwhile, Nick takes a step toward finding his future calling, and Stephanie faces an unexpected reaction when she confesses her feelings for the hospital's chaplain.
47	3	"The Honeymoon"	Stefan Scaini	Roger Grant	June 16, 2019	264294-50	2.02
As Cassie and Sam's honeymoon nears its end, they help a new friend reconcile with family and save a vineyard. Grace tries to recover after breaking up with her long-distance boyfriend, but finds it's not so simple to cover her sadness. Abigail joins the mayor of Blairsville for a charity event, but she is soon reminded of a centuries-old curse that separated their families. Martha freezes at her television audition, but turns on the charm at the last minute to win the part. Stephanie finds herself torn between two suitors, and Nick ghost-hunts at Grey House with an old friend, who seems to be searching for more than paranormal activity.
48	4	"The Prince"	Stefan Scaini	Erinne Dobson	June 23, 2019	264294-51	2.14
Cassie hosts royalty at Grey House and the visiting prince has a shocking secret. Sam is visited by an old friend in need of his medical expertise, but soon discovers that his cure may lie in Cassie's intuition. Grace starts an internship for Martha at City Hall and has fierce competition from a fellow intern, which benefits Abigail, who needs all the help she can get when the rival mayor's family tries to build on a Middleton landmark. Meanwhile, Martha prepares for the first episode of her television show, and Stephanie considers her romantic options.
49	5	"The Tea"	Steve DiMarco	Jesenia Ruiz & Carlee Malemute	June 30, 2019	264294-52	2.13
Cassie serves a special tea to help Abigail open up during a date with her former nemesis, newly reinstated mayor Martha shares her opinions with an artist painting her portrait, and two guests at Grey House reconnect. Meanwhile, Sam seeks help in teaching his new resident a lesson in bedside manner. Disappointed and discouraged after her top-choice college rejects her, Grace opens up to her fellow intern. Nick, however, feels his confidence shaken when he receives a college acceptance letter and focuses his nervous energy on restoring a car. Elsewhere, Stephanie debates a business partnership with Vincent, her new love interest.
50	6	"The Road Trip"	Steve DiMarco	Roger Grant	July 7, 2019	264294-53	1.93
Cassie and Grace visit a college that Grace is considering and where Cassie is receiving an honor. Grace connects with her homesick weekend host, while Cassie visits with her own college friend, Willow. Wanting a break from her fast-moving relationship with Donovan, Abigail tags along last minute. Left to watch Grey House, Sam tries helping his father/son guests to communicate better. Meanwhile, Martha switches to a hard-hitting gossip format to improve her TV show's struggling ratings, and Stephanie and Adam have a date.
51	7	"The Grey-cation"	Craig David Wallace	Cole Bastedo	July 28, 2019 (Note: Good Witch took a brief holiday during Hallmark Channel's "Christmas Keepsake" programming event July 12–27.)	264294-55	2.10
Cassie and Sam welcome two vacationers to Grey House, Martha and her husband. Seeing how the Tinsdales interact, though, proves how much the newlywed Radfords still have to learn about one another. Grace goes out with her fellow intern, Luke, unaware of his ulterior motives. Abigail meets Donovan's mother, Dotty, who believes an old curse should keep Abigail and Donovan apart. Meanwhile, Stephanie's budding relationship with Adam is challenged when his ex-fiancé visits, and Nick tries to support his injured friend.
52	8	"The Treasure"	Craig David Wallace	Cole Bastedo	August 4, 2019	264294-56	2.01
Cassie encourages Sam to look for mysteries to unlock, just as Martha unearths a long-lost town charter with a hidden treasure map. Vincent searches for the treasure, leading to an unexpected competition with another treasure seeker. Grace is hurt when she learns that Luke had been spying on Abigail for Dotty. Abigail continues to spar with her, until a crisis makes her reassess her relationship with Donovan. Meanwhile, Adam helps Stephanie with the launch of her food truck.
53	9	"The Comet"	Martin Wood	Vincent Pagano	August 11, 2019	264294-57	2.13
A wish-granting comet can be seen from Middleton, and the townsfolk think of their one wish. Cassie just wants the best for Sam, when he is offered a dream job across the country after successfully performing a tricky surgery. Grace prepares for her valedictorian speech, while Nick becomes unexpectedly nostalgic as high school nears its end. Abigail plans a trip to Europe to get over her breakup with Donovan, while he tries to win her back. Meanwhile, Martha struggles to make amends with her nemesis, and Stephanie and Adam are overwhelmed when their food truck is an instant sensation.
54	10	"The Graduation"	Martin Wood	Darin Goldberg	August 18, 2019	264294-58	2.31
As Cassie and Sam prepare to send Grace and Nick away to college, they are joined by Nick's mother (Gabrielle Miller), who worries about his upcoming move across the country. Grace spends her last days in Middleton helping a local fashion designer (Linda Thorson) make a dress for a client and uncovers her true passion in the process. With her food truck still thriving, Stephanie balances a busy workload and her relationship with Adam. Abigail, worried that the curse may be to blame, struggles to respond when Donovan shares his feelings for her. Meanwhile, Sam and Martha continue the hunt for the Middleton treasure, leading to an unexpected discovery.

=== Special (2019) ===
No.	Title	Directed by	Written by	Length	Original release date	Prod. code	U.S. viewers (millions)
55	"Good Witch: Curse from a Rose"	Craig Pryce	Daren Goldberg (part 1); Vincent Pagano (part 2)	84 minutes	October 19, 2019	264294-59; 264294-60	1.87
Cassie receives an unexpected visit from her college roommate Autumn Delaney (Lolita Davidovich), who harbors resentment toward Cassie over a past event. Martha plans a bonfire to honor the season and tries to ignore her husband's failure to recognize the anniversary of their engagement on Halloween night. Bad luck seems to thwart Sam's attempts to plan a romantic Halloween for Cassie, their first as a married couple, despite the arrival of a mysterious good luck charm. Donovan makes a wager with Abigail over the Halloween-themed triathlon he is racing against Sam, with the winner earning the rights to decide the couple's Halloween plans. Stephanie and Adam rally the town to break the pumpkin carving record held by Blairsville. Meanwhile, George and Nick search for Middleton's mythical sea monster. As the bonfire nears, Cassie helps Autumn overcome the past and take control of her future.

=== Season 6 (2020) ===
No. overall	No. in season	Title	Directed by	Written by	Original release date	Prod. code	U.S. viewers (millions)
56	1	"The Anniversary"	Stefan Scaini	Darin Goldberg	May 3, 2020	264294-61	1.88
Cassie gives Sam the perfect anniversary gift, causing anxiety for him to do so in kind. Martha and Dotty Davenport vie for the new mayor's mansion. Stephanie argues with her business partner about their food truck. Abigail and Donovan discover details about their respective families' curses. Joy (Katherine Barrell), a new Grey House guest, won't reveal to Cassie her reason for visiting Middleton, which seems to revolve around the Merriwicks.
57	2	"The Chili"	Stefan Scaini	Vincent Pagano	May 10, 2020	264294-62	1.98
Cassie helps Joy mark her mother's birthday by planting a tree. The two find a time capsule that Cassie and Grace buried. Joy is determined to learn more, when she captures a family tree picture, made by Grace, and a roll of camera film that fell off, which revealed pictures of Cassie's parents that were taken by her mother when she was 7. After George finished the last photo picture, it revealed Cassie holding hands with her second cousin Julia (Joy's mother), as Cassie discovers Joy is a Merriwick. Meanwhile, Sam, Donovan and George are preparing to enter the chili contest, Martha is pressured by Tom to start work on a footbridge she has been against, and Abigail's father brings his girlfriend for a visit, in order to win Abigail's blessing.
58	3	"The Clock"	Don McCutcheon	Erinne Dobson	May 17, 2020	264294-63	1.75
Cassie and Abigail welcome Joy into the family, although they knew she was a Merriwick since her arrival and Cassie is skeptical about her cousin. A clock attracts the attention of Martha and Joy, but when it's sold to another person named Carter in an estate sale, Joy challenges him to a game of darts. Cassie uses her intuition (causing the dart that hit the bullseye to fall on purpose) to make Joy lose her truck to Carter. Cassie has Joy realize that she shouldn't be out for herself but does get her truck back. Meanwhile, Stephanie gets a surprise visit from ex-husband Wes, making Adam feel uneasy; Martha is spurred on by her publisher friend to write a book; Sam helps two patients, who were once married, to reconcile, while discovering that the watch Cassie gave him actually belonged to the couple and returned it to them; George spends time with a fellow Air Force veteran who's visiting, and is looking for a kidney donor, which George volunteers; and Abigail helps out with Donovan's campaign rally speech by finding a song from his past.
59	4	"The Dinner"	Don McCutcheon	Cole Bastedo	May 24, 2020	264294-64	1.85
The cousins are preparing to celebrate Joy's introduction to the family. A dream candle will grant the Merriwick women their wishes and their dreams will come true, while discovering a candle that was unlit by another Merriwick, that reveal a message for the cousins. As Cassie entices Sam with a dream vacation to France, Abigail's dream of going to Italy has Donovan concerned believing that it could be tied to the curse; Martha gets a chance to test out her writing skills as a columnist while at the same time hires Carter to be the head carpenter at the mansion, which comes at a surprise to Joy; Stephanie learns that Wes is staying in Middleton to see the cabin being sold, and it puts a damper on Adam out of concern that Stephanie might still have feelings for her ex. The progressive dinner for the couples has Martha sniffing out which couple will see their hearts broken after she reads a letter; and Nick learns that he could fail physics and is hiding it from Sam. As the couples make a toast during the success of the progressive dinner, Adam loses his feeling on his right hand.
60	5	"The Mandala"	Annie Bradley	Darin Goldberg	May 31, 2020	264294-65	1.85
Joy and Abigail uncovers a clue that could break the curse as the crack in the ruby heart starts showing. Adam learns from Sam that he has a tumor and might require surgery, but Sam is concerned about whether it will go smoothly but he and Stephanie are supportive. Cassie is offered a job to teach French impression, using her experience and knowledge in mandalas to win over students and a professor who is skeptical about Cassie. Joy helps Carter look good for his dinner with his girlfriend who later breaks up with him; he realizes Joy did him a favor. Martha is looking forward to spending time with her son Dylan and wife Claire, who is expecting, but this mother and daughter-in-law bonding is off to a not-so-good start and Cassie makes Martha look at her past. Abigail and Donovan are stranded at an abandoned train station, where they figure out another clue to the curse that is tied to the place, which prompted the two to find a monocle hidden in the Middleton clock tower and it leads to a series of letters inscribed on a statue.
61	6	"The Dream"	Annie Bradley	Vincent Pagano	June 7, 2020	264294-66	1.92
Sam is concerned about his surgery to remove Adam's tumor, but Adam isn't sure about if he'll regain any movement afterwards, but thanks to Stephanie believing in Adam, his right hand regained feeling; Martha want things to go well to welcome a sister city she is courting, and is counting on George to help make the guests from the proposed sponsor French city feel at home. George also finds a nurse named Samantha very interesting and is keen on asking her out; Joy tells Cassie that a dream she had that Abigail and Donovan might break up come true, and the dissension between the two starts as predicted, leading Joy and Abigail to believe that a crescent moon occurring soon could affect everything. Cassie believes that a family who traveled under the moon in the present day could break the curse, but as the ruby heart cracked further, Abigail and Donovan are forced to break up; Cassie gives a couple of students a lesson in knowing each other, and not by accident, and seeing things through their own perspective. Sam and Stephanie performs “You've Got a Friend”.
62	7	"The Tableau"	Alison Reid	Erinne Dobson & Elysse Applebaum	June 14, 2020	264294-67	1.69
A series of portraits created by Nathaniel Merriwick over 200 years ago gives Martha an idea to recreate one of the tableau, which features Merriwick descendants, for an event. As Cassie leaves a chest for Abigail as a mediation, the cousins discover a painting belonging to another person, Priscilla Connelly, who was married to a Davenport and Dottie finally buried the hatchet with Abigail in order to help them get back together. An influencer is capturing the essence of Middleton but Cassie is making sure she experiences the influence for real when she blocks her Wi-Fi. Cassie gives Joy a family pearl necklace, but it might come in handy when she is challenged by Carter to set each other up with perfect dates, not knowing that they're made for each other. Adam is concerned that his hand might not be at full capacity. Martha and Stephanie are at odds over bylaws Martha had enforced. The tableau recreation revealed a deed left behind by Priscilla that adds another clue to the curse.
63	8	"The Chocolates"	Alison Reid	Darin Goldberg	June 21, 2020	264294-68	2.01
The cousins avoid using a family recipe for truth chocolates in an upcoming chocolate festival. Joy's former associate arrives to dissolve their partnership, and Joy uses the chocolates to learn the reason; the two agree to restart the partnership. Abigail and Donovan discover that Priscilla's past was a reason to stay apart. This also brings a new problem to Middleton, when Abigail's ex-boyfriend arrives to remind her of their pact to get married after he broke up with his now ex-girlfriend. Sam meets his new boss, Grant Collins, and they quarrel over making decisions. Martha is enticed by George to join his bowling team, but Martha isn't sure she can still pull off a perfect game. Adam mulls over taking a missionary assignment, which might cause him to be away from Stephanie. During trivia night, Donovan discovers a weather vane at the Connelly home is another clue to the curse, but it holds a message: "Hidden in plain sight."
64	9	"The Loft"	Jonathan Wright	Vincent Pagano	June 28, 2020	264294-69	1.82
A gift from her deceased mentor Olympia inspires Cassie to bring Abigail, Joy, Martha, Stephanie, and Donna on a road trip to Chicago. Cassie surprises her cousins at a ceremony that Olympia was a Connelly, shocking Abigail. Stephanie and Martha track down a pop-up shop in order to meet a chef. Donna tries to win over Joy and Abigail, but her behavior and attitude is making their partnership more difficult. The gift Cassie brought along for the trip was to help the ladies reveal their feelings about each other and to realize how much they mean to each other. Grant is making things more difficult for Sam over his commitment to the hospital, and even to Adam, who is suddenly fired as he prepares to mull over a new assignment. When Adam accepts the offer, he and Sam join the ladies in Chicago to explain the news to Stephanie, while Joy and Donna meet the elusive chef thanks to a baggage mixup.
65	10	"The Bird"	Jonathan Wright	Darin Goldberg	July 5, 2020	264294-70	1.90
As the ruby shows more cracks, the Merriwicks, along with Martha, Sam, and Donovan, scramble to put together the clues. The answers are revealed during Martha's housewarming party at the former Davenport mansion, despite Abigail's reluctance to be part of the ceremony. Donna offers Joy a remodeling job in Vermont, but Joy isn't sure she wants to go. Grant has Sam use his vacation days to spend time with Cassie. The long-distance situation between Adam and Stephanie is putting a strain on their relationship, along with Adam lacking courage to propose to Stephanie. Later in the evening, the aforementioned sextet discover the answer in the tableau, which leads them to a porcelain dove that Joy breaks with Olympia's crystal rock, revealing a diamond that was the missing piece in the music box. When placed inside the box, it opens up an engagement ring, which Donovan uses to propose to Abigail, thus breaking the curse. A purple bag with dirt inside is mysteriously sent to Cassie, Abigail, and Joy, setting up a new mystery that awaits the cousins.

=== Season 7 (2021) ===
No. overall	No. in season	Title	Directed by	Written by	Original release date	Prod. code	U.S. viewers (millions)
66	1	"The Party"	Jonathan Wright	Darin Goldberg	May 16, 2021	264294-71	1.71
In the months after breaking the curse, the cousins find themselves dealing with the mystery involving the pouches. Joy (who decided to stay after the Vermont project fell through) has a dream remembering building a symbol on a beach, while Cassie and Sam, whose busy schedule is keeping them apart, agree to a boating trip which in turn leads them to the same location where they find Joy's creation intact. Abigail and Donovan's agreement to a long engagement could end up becoming longer when Donovan's brother and Donovan's ex-girlfriend arrive and add to the tension. Stephanie, still upset over Adam's missionary work assignments, is mulling over whether to stay with him or move on to other people. Martha and Tom reluctantly agree to help out their pregnant daughter-in-law, even though Martha is being the most reluctant to get involved. At the event to celebrate Abigail and Donovan's engagement, Donovan tells everyone including Dottie about not setting the wedding date yet but his jealousy with his brother boils over to the point of Abigail asking Donovan to spend time apart for now. Later that evening, the cousins open the pouches and pour it on a canvas Cassie drew that revealed the symbol, and discover George is involved.
67	2	"The Shell"	Jonathan Wright	Vincent Pagano	May 23, 2021	264294-72	1.51
Cassie, Abigail and Joy learn the origins of the pouches of soil but have more questions than answers. Cassie and Sam's double date with hospital administrator Grant and his girlfriend, Monica, doesn't go quite as planned. All of Middleton flashes back to the '50s when Martha organizes a "Grease" themed movie night in the park that ends with a surprise romantic gesture.
68	3	"The Delivery"	Stefan Scaini	Darin Goldberg	May 30, 2021	264294-73	1.61
Cassie, Stephanie and Abigail help Martha throw Claire a baby shower, sparking memories of Cassie's own baby shower.
69	4	"The Exchange"	Stefan Scaini	Vincent Pagano	June 6, 2021	264294-74	1.54
Sam is excited to perform surgery on a star basketball player. Joy makes a discovery and decides to revive the Middleton Exchange tradition.
70	5	"The Kite"	Alison Reid	Darin Goldberg	June 13, 2021	264294-75	1.36
Joy's dream sends the three Merriwicks on a search for Phillip Harper, Joy's father.
71	6	"The Wishes"	Alison Reid	Vincent Pagano	June 20, 2021	264294-76	1.45
When Cassie, Abigail, and Joy toss coins into the historic wishing well, wishes old and new start coming true.
72	7	"The Magic"	Stefan Scaini	Darin Goldberg	June 27, 2021	264294-77	N/A
As the Merriwicks delve into the images on Joy's vision board, Cassie accompanies Sam on a trip to his childhood home to care for his sister, whose illness is progressing.
73	8	"The Sprint"	Stefan Scaini	Vincent Pagano	July 11, 2021	264294-78	1.54
Cassie and Sam are disagreeing about his return to work after his shoulder surgery. Flower Universe is trying to undercut Abigail's business, but she won't go down without a fight. Martha and Tom's special anniversary celebration brings all their friends together.
74	9	"The Search"	Jonathan Wright	Deanna Shumaker	July 18, 2021	264294-79	1.64
The pressure is on because strange things start happening to Cassie, Abigail and Joy's abilities, adding urgency to finding a Merriwick family heirloom.
75	10	"The Wedding"	Jonathan Wright	Darin Goldberg	July 25, 2021	264294-80	1.86
Cassie, Abigail, Joy and George come together to protect the Merriwick magic from the mysterious force over Middleton. Cassie and Sam make a momentous decision about their life together.
