= Mima Cataldo =

- Education: Syracuse University
- Years active: Late 1960s-Present
- Known for: Feminist photography
- Movement: Women's liberation movement
- Website: https://www.mimacataldo.com

Mima Cataldo is a feminist artist and a women's rights activist known for her social justice photography.

== Career in education ==
Mima Cataldo was a professor at Syracuse University. She taught sociology and advised on academic projects. Cataldo also worked for the Tiburon School District in Northern California.

== Seneca Women's Encampment for a Future of Peace and Justice ==
Cataldo photographed the 1983 Seneca Women's Encampment for a Future of Peace and Justice in the summer of 1983. Along with Ruth Putter, Bryna Fireside and Elaine Lytel, she published a book about this event in 1987. The book was dedicated to feminist peace activist Barbara Deming. Cataldo included a photo of Deming in her book talking to a group of women who attended this encampment. The publication included numerous pictures including some of the participants doing physical work to build the camp. In 1987, Cataldo was quoted in the Sunday Democrat and Chronicle newspaper stating, "This was history in the making as far away as we were concerned. I think it was the first time I saw the women's movement take a radical step for peace." She donated the negatives from the photos she took to the Schlesinger Library in 2015.

== Photography and publications ==
Cataldo is well known for her photography and has participated in numerous art shows. She has taken photos of feminist events since 1969.

=== 1970s ===
In 1976, Cataldo's work was featured at Sister Bear Bookstore in Liverpool, New York, alongside the work of Ruth Putter, Ginny Lloyd, Courtney Frisse, and Judy Ivry. In 1977, she participated in an exhibit at Le Moyne College Art Gallery.

=== 1980s ===
In 1984 her photo of anti-nuclear war protesters in Syracuse was published in the Syracuse Herald-Journal. In 1986, Cataldo's photography was featured at Syracuse City Hall in an exhibit organized by the Syracuse Commission for Women.

=== 2000s ===
In 2001, the Light Work Gallery at Syracuse University launched an exhibition titled Images of Resistance: 35 Years of Social Activism and Democracy in Central NY featuring "a retrospective...of the women's and peace movements." In 2002, her work appeared at the Central Library in Syracuse. Cataldo's feminist activism was featured in the book Feminists Who Changed America which was published in 2006.

=== 2010s ===
In 2010, Cataldo hosted an art exhibit with Ruth Putter in Syracuse, New York at ArtRage Gallery. In March of that year, she hosted an event about photography as social activism for radical women in San Francisco.

In 2011, her black and white photographs were exhibited in SNAP: Journal Juried Exhibition of Photography at the Bedford Gallery in Walnut Creek, California.

She took photos of the fires in the North Bay region of California in 2017 and 2018.

=== 2020s ===
Cataldo remained a prolific writer and photographer during the 2020s. In 2023, Harvard University featured her photography in their Gazette. The following year, Cataldo's work was featured in an article titled, "Are Gen-Z 'Activists' Protesting or Performing in Ha'Am, UCLA's Jewish newspaper. In 2024, she also published an article titled Remembering Howie in Visual Studios.

Cataldo participated in a 2025 exhibit at SFAC Galleries in San Francisco. In 2026, Cataldo's work was featured in a poster highlighting 250 years of people's resistance published by Syracuse Cultural Workers and in a Bay Area photography exhibit called The Image Flow.

== Personal life ==
Mima Cataldo is the daughter of Anthony Cataldo, a lawyer, and Ada Cataldo who performed on Broadway. She graduated from the University of Michigan in 1965 where she earned a degree in music. Cataldo earned a master's degree from Columbia in 1972 and a Ph.D. from Syracuse University in social science in 1979. While studying at Syracuse in 1978, Cataldo signed a letter of protest against Queen Farah from Iran coming to speak on campus to protest the Pahlavi Dynasty. She has two children.
