= Psi Factor =

Canadian science fiction drama television series

- Also known as: Psi Factor: Chronicles of the Paranormal
- Genre: Science fiction Drama
- Created by: Peter Aykroyd; Christopher Chacon; Peter Ventrella
- Developed by: James Nadler
- Presented by: Dan Aykroyd
- Starring: Paul Miller; Nancy Anne Sakovich; Barclay Hope; Colin Fox; Maurice Dean Wint; Matt Frewer; Nigel Bennett; Peter MacNeill; Jo Vannicola; Soo Garay
- Country of origin: Canada
- Original language: English
- No. of seasons: 4
- No. of episodes: 88 (list of episodes)

Production
- Executive producers: James Nadler; Seaton McLean; Peter Aykroyd; Christopher Chacon
- Running time: 44 minutes
- Production companies: Alliance Atlantis Communications (seasons 3-4); Atlantis Films (seasons 1-2); Eyemark Entertainment (seasons 1-4); King World (season 4)

Original release
- Network: Syndicated
- Release: September 28, 1996 – May 20, 2000

Psi Factor: Chronicles of the Paranormal /ˈpsaɪ/ is a Canadian science fiction drama television series which was filmed in and around Toronto, Ontario, Canada, and aired 88 episodes over four seasons from 1996 to 2000. In 1996, Christopher Chacon and Peter Aykroyd co-created the show.

== Plot ==
The series was hosted by Peter Aykroyd's brother Dan Aykroyd, who presents dramatic stories inspired by the paranormal investigations of the "Office of Scientific Investigation and Research" (O.S.I.R.).

=== Season one ===
The first season introduces members of the O.S.I.R. team, including case managers Conner Doyle (Paul Miller) and Curtis Rollins (Maurice Dean Wint), senior data analyst Lindsay Donner (Nancy Anne Sakovich), physicist Peter Axon (Barclay Hope), Dr. Anton Hendricks (Colin Fox) as well as various other investigators that rotate with each new case. The first season uses elements that are later dropped in subsequent seasons, most notably featuring two unlinked cases per episode. The first season features more of a documentary-style look including hand-held cameras and on-screen interviews with the "experiencers". In the first-season finale, "Perestroika", case manager Conner Doyle is killed in an explosion in an attempt to save the team and to kill a deadly parasite.

=== Season two ===
Starting with the second season, actors Paul Miller and Maurice Dean Wint are removed from the opening credits and Matt Frewer joins the cast as the new case manager, Matt Praeger. Michael Moriarty joins the cast in the recurring role of Michael Kelly, a conspiracy theorist who is friends with Praeger. The series now focuses on one case per episode and is structured more like a one-hour drama series. The second season features more character development as well as story arcs. After a limited role in the first season, Director of Operations Frank Elsinger (Nigel Bennett) becomes a more prominent presence and is often believed to have a hidden agenda, mostly by Matt Praeger who questions many of his decisions. Michael Kelly causes problems for Elsinger, as he often involves himself in various O.S.I.R. cases and tries to expose the truth. In the second-season finale, "The Egress" (part one of a three-part story arc where the team discovers "The Egress", an arch in which you disappear if you step inside), Curtis Rollins returns after being absent since near the end of the first season. Dr. Anton Hendricks is lured into the arch at the sight of his missing wife and daughter, and he disappears. The team is in conflict at the end of the season, as Praeger learns Lindsay has betrayed him by leaking information, meant to expose Elsinger's questionable ethical activity. Praeger offers his resignation, and Elsinger offers Peter Axon the case manager position.

=== Season three ===
Starting with the third season, Nigel Bennett and Peter MacNeill as Frank Elsinger and Ray Donahue respectively are added to the opening credits, after having guest roles throughout the first two seasons. Peter Axon and Curtis Rollins continue investigating the Arch and try to get Anton back. As Peter convinces Lindsay to come back to the team, Praegar also returns to the team. Anton eventually comes back from the Arch and is in the hospital in critical condition. It's revealed that Anton's wife, believed to be dead, comes back from the Arch as well. The return of Nicole Hendricks solves a 12-year-old case in which Anton's wife and daughter disappeared after a car crash. In the two-part third-season finale, "Forever and a Day", Michael Kelley returns and informs the team of The Chairman, a mysterious figure who is believed to be evil and immortal and control a series of interlocking companies, including Veritec, Tessler Industries and the O.S.I.R. They then begin a secret case in which they discover the identity of The Chairman and exorcise the demon. The end of the third season marks the final appearances of many original characters, including Curtis Rollins, Frank Elsinger, Ray Donahue, Lennox Q. Cooper, and Michael Kelly.

=== Season four ===
Starting with the fourth season, Nigel Bennett and Peter MacNeill are removed from the opening credits, while Soo Garay as Dr. Claire Davison is added to the opening credits, after having guest roles throughout the first three seasons. Jo Vannicola joins the main cast as Mia Stone. With Elsinger apparently gone, Anton Hendricks has taken over the role of Director of Operations and very rarely takes part in the investigations over the course of the season. Hendricks enforces rotating case manager, leading Peter, Lindsay and Mia to take on the case manager position for different cases. In the fifth episode of the season, "883", Matt Praeger is infected with a virus which will lead to his death. The team soon discovers a secret project where a doctor is planning on colonizing a new world. Praeger learns the only way he could live is if he goes to the new world. After agreeing, he shares a tearful goodbye with his daughter Dana as well as the rest of the O.S.I.R. team and leaves a goodbye tape. Beginning with the following episode, Matt Frewer is removed from the opening credits and Nancy Anne Sakovich receives first billing. In episode 18 of the season, "Regeneration", presumed dead Conner Doyle returns and reveals he was pulled out of the building before it exploded and then spent three years in Siberia where he was held prisoner in a research facility in order to study an alien parasite that he had contracted during the original mission. He returns to aid the team in which they investigate "Project Regeneration", where a genetically altered female has the ability to heal herself, but with alien DNA that will take over and make her violent. Lindsay finds out that her cells were used to create Lilith, and that she retains all of Lindsay's memories. Conner suggests a plasma transfusion where Lindsay's cells could be introduced into Lilith to enhance her human side. During the transfusion, it's revealed Lilith is pregnant, Conner has alien DNA, and he is trying to save their alien child. Peter and Anton release a toxic gas into the secured lab, killing Conner and Lilith. In the fourth season finale, "Stone Dreams", we learn Mia Stone has been subject to a secret experiment conducted by Anton Hendricks when she first arrived to the O.S.I.R. The experiment aims to determine the impact of paranormal investigation on the investigator. Anton tests the technology on Mia, which will enable them to access the images that are seen with the inner eye. During the test, Anton hypnotizes Mia and gets her to remember past events that then are reflected on the monitor. As the test gets more intense, her heart rate increases and her brainwave functions becomes erratic and all the glass in the lab explodes. The last scene of the episode shows Mia first meeting Anton and accepting to be a part of the experiment. It's unknown if Mia died or not as a result of the experiment.

== Criticism ==
In 1997, the Committee for Skeptical Inquiry presented the Snuffed Candle Award to Dan Aykroyd (in absentia) for hosting Psi Factor and being a "long-time promoter ... of paranormal claims". Following the awards, CSI fellow Joe Nickell wrote to Aykroyd asking for the research behind the "cases" presented on Psi Factor, particularly a claim that NASA scientists were "killed while investigating a meteor crash and giant eggs were found and incubated, yielding a flea the size of a hog".

== Cast and characters ==
=== Main cast ===
Main cast per opening credits.

- Dan Aykroyd as The Host
- Paul Miller as Case Manager Professor Conner Doyle (Season 1, guest star Season 4)
- Nancy Anne Sakovich as Senior Data Analyst Lindsay Donner
- Barclay Hope as Physicist Peter Axon
- Colin Fox as Dr. Anton Hendricks
- Maurice Dean Wint as Case Manager Dr. Curtis Rollins (Season 1, recurring Season 2–3)
- Matt Frewer as Case Manager Matt Praeger (Season 2–4)
- Nigel Bennett as Director of Operations Frank Elsinger (Season 3, recurring Season 1–2)
- Peter MacNeill as Security Co-ordinator Ray Donahue (Season 3, recurring Season 1–2)
- Jo Vannicola as Dr. Mia Stone (Season 4)
- Soo Garay as Dr. Claire Davison (Season 4, recurring Season 1–3)

=== Recurring cast ===
- Peter Blais as Cryptozoologist Lennox Q. Cooper (Season 1–3)
- Lisa LaCroix as Dr. Natasha Constantine (Season 1)
- Tamara Gorski as Dr. Alexandra Corliss (Season 1)
- Lindsay Collins as Dr. Sandra Miles (Season 1–3)
- Michael Moriarty as Michael Kelly (Season 2–3)
- Heather Bertram as Dana Praeger (Season 2–4)
- Anthony Lemke as Marc Hagan (Season 3)

=== Guest actors ===
- Linda Blair
- Lindy Booth
- Nicholas Campbell
- Les Carlson
- Maury Chaykin
- Emmanuelle Chriqui
- A.J. Cook
- Nicole de Boer
- Harlan Ellison
- Ryan Gosling
- Graham Greene
- Corey Haim
- Emily Hampshire
- Margot Kidder
- Alison Pill
- Wayne Robson
- Carlo Rota
- Caterina Scorsone
- Katheryn Winnick

== Home media ==
The entire series has been released in Region 2 format in the UK, Germany and Russia since the show's cancellation. On December 30, 2008, the complete third season was released on Region 1 DVD. Echo Bridge Home Entertainment later released a condensed version of the same season on October 6, 2009.

In 2010, Alliance Home Entertainment released the entire series on DVD in Canada.

Season	Episodes	Release date
Season 1	22	July 13, 2010
Season 2	22	August 10, 2010
Season 3	22	September 14, 2010
Season 4	22	October 19, 2010
