= London Central Elementary High School =

United States Department of Defense Dependents School

Coordinates: 51.617°N 0.746°W

London Central Elementary High School (LCEHS), formerly London Central High School, was a United States Department of Defense Dependents School (DoDDS) in the Isles District of DoDDS Europe for pupils in kindergarten through grade 12. It operated from 1952 until 2007, with its first graduating class in 1953.

In about 2005 the average number of students was 360 and there were at least 75 students boarding. Students originated from the United States and Canada, with most students being in military families; those from non-military families paid tuition fees. The school had a high rate of students enrolling or transferred away due to job changes. Students living in dormitories, which served grades 9–12, had parents doing military duties or other duties for the U.S. federal government in remote areas in other countries.

LCEHS fell under the command of the U.S. Naval Activities, United Kingdom (COMNAVACTUK).

The three co-founders of the band America met while students.

== History ==
London Central High School (commonly known as "LCHS" or just "Central") was established in 1952 at Bushy Park, in south west London, for students in grades 7 through 12. Subsequent base closures led to two moves: to Bushey Hall in 1962, and to RAF Daws Hill, its final location, in 1971.

For the 2006–07 school year, LCHS merged with West Ruislip Elementary School, which had closed in the spring of 2006. Consequently, it accommodated grades K-12 and "elementary" was added to the school's name. At the time of its closing, LCEHS was the last remaining DoDDS school with dormitories.

The USNAVEUR Headquarters were relocated from London to Naples, Italy in 2007. As a result, RAF Daws Hill, along with other naval installations in the area, was scaled down and eventually closed. LCHS staged a formal closing ceremony on 15 May 2007, and locked its doors for the last time in June 2007, with a handover of keys back to the US Navy/RAF on 30 June. The website was completely removed in mid-June 2014.

== Facilities ==
Male students lived in Mansfield Hall while female students lived in Trinity Hall.

== Notable students ==
- Charles Baker, actor
- Gerry Beckley, co-founder of the band America
- Bo Bice, singer
- Dewey Bunnell, co-founder of the band America
- Jerry Donahue, guitarist and producer
- Charles Easley, Mississippi Supreme Court Judge
- William Frederick Fisher, NASA astronaut and physician
- Megan McArthur, NASA astronaut and oceanographer
- Paul Miller, Canadian actor
- Dan Peek, co-founder of the band America
- Doc Rosser, former keyboardist for John Mellencamp and convicted felon
- Dale Van Atta, columnist

A book about London Central High School entitled From the Faculty Lounge was published in 2008. It features memories of the school in all three of its locations from around 35 former principals, teachers and staff.
