= RAF Daws Hill =

Ministry of Defence site

RAF Daws Hill
- Near High Wycombe, Buckinghamshire in England
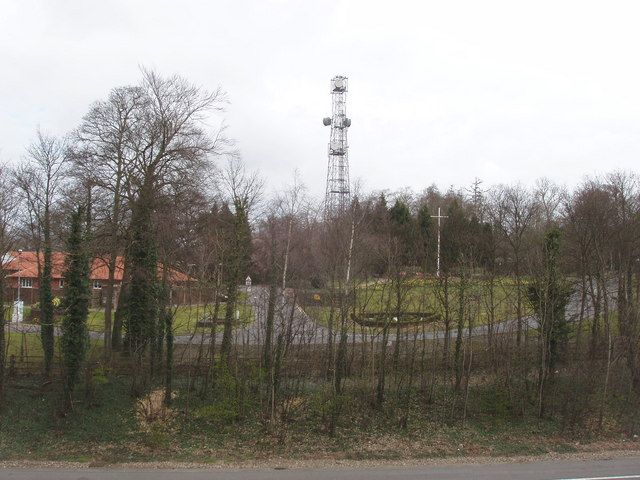
- A communications mast at RAF Daws Hill during 2008

Site information
- Type: Non-flying station occupied by US Visiting Forces
- Owner: Ministry of Defence (MOD)
- Operator: Royal Air Force; United States Army Air Forces; United States Air Force; United States Navy
- Condition: Closed

Location
- Shown within Buckinghamshire RAF Daws Hill (the United Kingdom)
- Coordinates: 51°37′08″N 000°44′45″W
- Area: 190 hectares

Site history
- Built: 1942
- In use: 1942–2007
- Fate: Site sold by MOD for residential redevelopment, most station buildings demolished.; Former bunker listed by English Heritage in 2013.

RAF Daws Hill was a Ministry of Defence site, located near High Wycombe and Flackwell Heath, in Buckinghamshire, England, close to the M40 motorway.

The station was established in 1942 on land owned by Wycombe Abbey School, for use by the United States military. Initially used by the United States Army Air Forces, RAF Daws Hill was used in its later years by the United States Navy. It became an important part of US defence in the United Kingdom during the 1980s, housing a nuclear bunker with a control centre for the direction of nuclear bombers and cruise missiles. As a result of this and the wider presence of US nuclear weapons on British soil during the 1980s and 1990s, the site became home to a peace camp between 1982 and 1985.

Following a review of Ministry of Defence properties in the south-east of England, the station closed in 2007 and the site was sold to a property developer in 2011. The station's nuclear bunker received Grade II* listed status from English Heritage in October 2013, and much of the remaining site was cleared for redevelopment as housing during 2015.

== History ==
=== Establishment ===
American military forces were first stationed at High Wycombe in 1942, shortly after the United States' formal entrance into the Second World War. So urgent was the action that Wycombe Abbey School, situated on the land that would become the station, was given three weeks to find new facilities; failure in this effort led to the school's closing, until the independent girls' school was returned by the US in 1945. An underground bunker, which later became a nuclear-reinforced bunker was built within the grounds of the school and was codenamed "Pinetree".

The VIII Bomber Command Headquarters was at RAF Daws Hill and known as USAAF Station 1101.

In 1952, the station, formerly known as Daws Hill House, welcomed US forces again. From 1952 to 1965 the station appears to have housed a command bunker for the 7th Air Division, the UK-based elements of Strategic Air Command. The following years of the Cold War saw fluctuation in the station's importance.

Approximately 800 personnel were stationed there when, in 1969, their numbers were reduced, so that, in the early 1970s, only a small group remained for upkeep of facilities.

Then, in 1975, activity escalated, revitalising the station's importance to the American military in Europe. Its nuclear bunker, with 23,000 square feet (2,100 square meters) of space, housed high-tech equipment for the direction of nuclear bombers and guided missiles.

Between 1982 and 1985 there was a peace camp outside the base protesting against the bringing of United States cruise missiles to the United Kingdom.

Use of the station was reduced with the end of the Cold War; by 1992, US Defense personnel at RAF Daws Hill numbered fewer than 350.

=== Closure and redevelopment ===
In 2002, the UK Ministry of Defence proposed to close RAF Daws Hill some years in the future, turning the 50 acres (20 ha) of land over to other public and private use and relocating American Naval personnel and activities to other locations near London, particularly RAF Uxbridge. The plan apparently fizzled, however, when the US Navy voiced its preference to remain. High Wycombe, desiring to build at least 400 new houses by 2011 for its growing population, considered the land ideal for up to 600 houses; but nearby residents also rejected the proposal because of the changes that it would entail, including increased traffic on relatively quiet roads.

During 2007 the US Navy staged a withdrawal from the greater London area, leading to the facilities at RAF Daws Hill becoming surplus to operational requirements. Station facilities including the shops, workshops and petrol station closed in August 2007, followed by the remainder of the station later that year.

In June 2011, the site was placed up for sale by the Ministry of Defence. Taylor Wimpey subsequently bought the site, planning to build a housing estate of around 500 homes. Some personnel and their families remained on the site, occupying the housing while alternative accommodation was found. The Ministry of Defence continued to rent the 67 bungalows from Taylor Wimpey until September 2011. Local residents formed the Daws Hill Residents' Association in light of the proposals for redeveloping the site, following concerns over the impact it could have on the area.

in 2012, season 2 episode 2 of the British sci-fi TV show 'Black Mirror' was filmed in the base, for its abandoned housing estate.

In March 2012, the Ministry of Defence sought permission from Wycombe District Council for the demolition of the station's Cold War bunker by the summer. However, in September 2014 it received Grade II* protected status listing from English Heritage. By January 2015 demolition of the bungalows was underway and by February 2017, 50 homes had been completed out of a projected 444. As of March 2022, all 444 homes are complete. The estate is called Pine Trees and roads have been given names such as Kennedy Avenue, Arizona Way and Eisenhower Lower Close to reflect US Forces having been previously based there.

== London Central Elementary High School ==
The station was home, between 1971 and 2007, to London Central Elementary High School, part of the Department of Defense Dependents Schools, with pupils in grades K–12. Also at Daws Hill were 70 housing units for American personnel and their families. Other facilities include warehouses and those for vehicle maintenance, as well as support buildings for persons who lived and worked at the station, such as a bank, a post office, a bowling alley, sports grounds and buildings, a small exchange, an automobile refuelling station, and a social club.

The school's final class graduated in 2007 when the school closed.

== See also ==
- List of former Royal Air Force stations
- Strategic Air Command in the United Kingdom
