= Seneca Women's Encampment for a Future of Peace and Justice =

The Seneca Women's Encampment for a Future of Peace and Justice was a women-only peace camp formed to protest the scheduled deployment of Cruise and Pershing II missiles before their suspected shipment from the Seneca Army Depot to Europe in the fall of 1983.

The camp took place mainly during the summer of 1983, from July 4 through Labor Day, concluding with a Labor Day Action honoring workers and highlighting the inflation and job loss that militarism brings. Thousands of women came to participate and rally against nuclear weapons and the "'patriarchal society' that created and used those weapons." The encampment continued through till 1994 when it "transitioned" into a "Women's Peace Land." Through its entire existence it continued to make the same principled philosophical connections between militarism, patriarchy, racism, high rates of inflation, unemployment and global poverty, sexual & physical violence, addiction, oppression, & abuse in its many forms, and global environmental destruction. As it evolved the first summer, it became a living expression of all women's skills & empowerment, as well as a visible celebration of a joyful lesbian sub-culture. The encampment continued as an active political presence in the Finger Lakes area for at least five more years, supporting anti-nuclear education and the connections between ecofeminism, nonviolence, the need for civil disobedience and ideas of permaculture and sustainability.

== Name ==
The encampment has also been referred to as: Seneca, the Encampment, the Women's Encampment, the Women's Peace Camp, the Peace Camp, the Seneca Peace Camp and the Seneca Women's Encampment for a Future of Peace and Justice.

== Vision Statement ==
The following statement was taken from the back cover of the encampment handbook:

"Women have played an important role throughout our history in opposing violence and oppression. We have been the operators of the Underground Railroad, the spirit of the equal rights movement and the strength among tribes. In 1848 the first Women's Rights Convention met at Seneca Falls giving shape and voice to the 19th century feminist movement.

Once again women are gathering at Seneca – this time to challenge the nuclear threat at its doorstep. The Seneca Army Depot, a Native American homeland once (nurtured?) and protected by the Iroquois, is now the storage site for the neutron bomb and most likely the Pershing II missile and is the departure point for weapons to be deployed in Europe. Women from New York State, from the United States and Canada, from Europe, and, indeed, from all over the world are committed to nonviolent action to stop the deployment of these weapons.

The existence of nuclear weapons is killing us. Their production contaminates our environment, destroys out natural resources, and ... our human dignity and creativity. But the most critical danger they represent is to life itself. Sickness, accidents, genetic damage and death. These are the real products of the nuclear arms race. We say no to the threat of global holocaust, no to the arms race, no to death. We say yes to a world where people, animals, plants, and the earth itself are respected and valued."

== History ==
Romulus is located within fourteen miles of both Seneca Falls, which is the birthplace of women's rights, and Waterloo, the birthplace of Memorial Day. The area was a station on the Underground Railroad and home to Elizabeth Cady Stanton.

The encampment patterned itself on the Greenham Common Women's Peace Camp in England. Other camps were set up in Italy and the Netherlands. In June 1982, many people met in New York for the largest U.S. antinuclear demonstration to date (with half a million people participating) and for the Conference on Global Feminism and Disarmament that preceded it. After 1983, only a few women lived on the campground, but their annual demonstrations were still large gatherings of nearly 800 women. By 1990, however, camp leaders responded to dwindling numbers by holding a "transform or die" discussion about the future of the Women's Encampment for Peace and Justice, which went on to establish the non-profit land trust Women's Peace Land.

=== Chronology ===
- February, 1983 – local officials first alerted to peace camp through Buffalo newspaper
- April – formal camp name chosen
- May 23 – camp land purchased, peace camp organizers held first press conference
- Early June – women invited to local churches
- June 9 – Local resident offers American flag to the camp (rejected on June 13)
- July 4 – camp opened (activities include slow walk to depot)
- July 17 – New York City women's letter to Seneca County sheriff gave notice of plans for a march from Seneca Falls to the encampment by way of Waterloo on July 30
- August 1 – central demonstration involving approximately 1500-3000 people
- September 5 – camp closes for the year

== Participants ==
There were many different people and organizations involved in the planning and running of the encampment. Both local and outside women alike participated. The policy of the encampment was to not single out any specific women for their efforts in the organization or running of it. Rather, it was a collective effort and its organizational and political strategies have been analyzed.

The main organizations involved were the Women's International League for Peace and Freedom, Catholics against Nuclear Arms, the War Resisters League, Women Strike for Peace, Women's Pentagon Action, Rochester Peace and Justice, and the Upstate Feminist Peace Alliance.

Participants wrote about, photographed, or otherwise documented their experiences at the Women's Encampment for a Future of Peace and Justice. Mima Cataldo attended the camp during the summer of 1983 and documented the encampment through her photography. She published a book with Ruth Putter, Bryna Fireside and Elaine Lytel about the camp titled, The Women's Encampment for a Future of Peace and Justice: Images and Writings. The book was dedicated to longtime peace activist Barbara Deming.

Leeann Irwin was an early organizer of the Women's Pentagon action and an active participant in the Encampment, having committed to live at the Women's encampment for a year before it opened, and later organizing a speaking tour of Europe in 1984 on the peace work being done at the camp. Sybil Claiborne collected correspondence, meeting notes, mailing lists, clippings, and leaflets of the Women's Encampment for a Future of Peace and Justice. Cynthia Butler (Cynthia B. Costello) wrote a 13-page document, "Report from Seneca" with Amy Stanley, describing the history of the encampment and providing an analysis of related issues.

The encampment attracted thousands of women, from many different places and with different political views, sexual orientations, religions, ethnicities, and economic backgrounds. Although a significant number of men shared interest in the encampment's cause, they were neither allowed to join the encampment nor participate in the protests. Any male over the age of twelve was not let onto the main grounds, though there was a place in the front lawn where they could stay. This decision was highly controversial. Many women argued that the group was being exclusionary by not allowing men into the encampment, and mothers argued that sons over the age of twelve who were firm believers in the anti-nuclear cause should be allowed to come.

== Community and Media Reactions ==
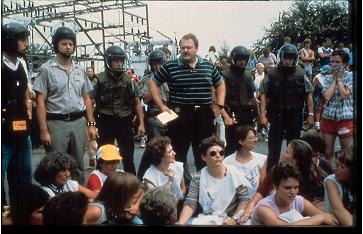
sit-in

The encampment did not integrate well with the surrounding conservative community.

Damage was done in an early publication by the encampment which denigrated the educational level of local residents and was seen by many to be patronizing and condescending. Regular counter-protests took place at the encampment's events. The civil unrest also caused resentment by law enforcement agencies because of the extra work associated with monitoring the protests and managing traffic problems which resulted from the events. Events from July 30 to August 3 led to more than $100,000 in additional policing costs; although they were a local expense at the time, the money was later reimbursed by the federal government. In November 1984, articles titled "Witches of Seneca" were published in the Syracuse Post-Standard. The articles characterized the participating women as "lesbians" and "vegetarians" and noted specific information about their witchcraft and feminist practices. At the time the activities at the encampment were declining and while the articles did not have a major impact, they did confirm for many their assumptions about the movement's supporters.

== Ritual ==
The encampment utilized a number of different techniques in their protests to bring their causes and issues to the attention of the outside world. They used many ritual elements. The women would protest in large circles, holding hands, and weave webs of yarn around each other and around the fence of the Army Depot, with objects of meaning also incorporated. They performed slow walks, where they would walk in slow-motion; twisting, turning, and pulling each other along. In one protest they tied themselves to the fence with ribbons and yarn, and moaned and screamed. There was a 'zukes not nukes' week where they stormed the fence and filled it with zucchinis. Other demonstrations featured singing, dancing, masks, costumes, makeup, and signs. Sometimes die-ins were performed, to imitate war casualties. There was even a laundry ritual, in which women hung up signs in a local laundromat while doing their laundry.

== The Waterloo Bridge Incident ==
Preceding their march on the Saturday, July 30, 1983, several women from the NYC Women's Pentagon Action wrote a letter to the sheriff of Seneca County to inform him of their plans. They intended to walk from Seneca Falls, through Waterloo to the peace camp in Romulus at the Army Depot, stopping at historic sites regarding the women's rights movement on their way. There were no local laws requiring a permit and so none could be issued.

The walk was without incident until its path was blocked at a bridge on Washington Street in Waterloo. A large group of local residents blocked the road and refused to leave. The marchers responded to the situation by sitting down on the road in an effort to reduce the confrontational atmosphere.

The standoff lasted for some time as the sheriff tried to convince the marchers to give up their march. Although many of the marchers had not yet been to the encampment, the sheriff sent to the encampment to have leaders brought to the scene in an effort to resolve the situation. When many women continued to refuse to leave the road, they were charged with disorderly conduct and taken into custody; some marchers did clear the road and were not charged. One local woman, the wife of a bank president, felt that those blocking the road, not the marchers, should be arrested and she joined the marchers and was charged as well. A total of 54 women were detained; nearly all refused to identify themselves, and so they were held in lieu of bail which they refused to post.

They were taken by school bus to the Seneca County Jail where they were arraigned. They were then taken to the South Seneca Elementary School in Interlaken where they were held until the following Wednesday.

The largest protest at the depot organized by the encampment took place on Monday, Aug. 1. The peaceful event, which did involve many women climbing the depot's fence, took place while the women were still in custody.

On August 3 the women were transported to the Seneca County Fairgrounds in Waterloo where a makeshift court room was set up so the women could appear before the village justice. After several hours of individual court proceedings, the justice called a break in the proceedings. When he returned, he called all the defendants into the building and dismissed the charges against them in the interest of justice.

== Legacy ==
Another anti-nuclear weapons protest occurred at the depot in October 1983, which was not sponsored by the Women's Encampment, although some encampment participants did participate.

After the main encampment ended in the summer of 1983, several smaller demonstrations occurred at the depot the following summer. While a token presence at the encampment continued for a few years, the activity declined each year. In 1986, the Window Peace project in New York City paid tribute to both this encampment and the Greenham Common Women's Peace Camp.

In the early 1990s, the Special Weapons area at the Seneca Army Depot, which is where the protesters believed the nuclear weapons were stored, was closed and the Army acknowledged that the base's Special Weapons mission had ended. Not long after the base was listed for closure under the Base Realignment and Closure Act. The depot was finally decommissioned and shut down in September 2000.

Since the mid-1990s, the base has been undergoing redevelopment for non-military purposes. Among those now in place is a state prison (Five Points Correctional Facility). For a time the former troop housing area was used as a program for troubled teenagers by Kid's Peace and then by the Hillside Children's Center. That area has been sold by the Seneca County IDA and is vacant. Depot land also has been re-utilized for a Seneca County Jail, and various buildings at the base are being used for warehousing.

== See also ==
- Women Strike for Peace
- Greenham Common Women's Peace Camp
- Counterculture of the 1960s
- List of anti-war organizations
- The Ribbon International
- Goddess movement
- Women-only space
- Khan, Billie (January 1984). "Seneca Falls: A Women's Demonstration for Peace". Humanist. 44 (1): 23–38. ISSN 0018-7399.
- Costello, Cynthia; Stanley, Amy Dru (1985). "Report from Seneca". Frontiers: A Journal of Women Studies. 8 (2): 32–39. doi:10.2307/3346051. JSTOR 3346051.
- Paley, Grace (1989). "The Seneca Stores: Tales from the Women's Peace Encampment". In Russell, Diana E. H (ed.). Exposing Nuclear Phallacies. New York: Pergamon Press. pp. 216–222. ISBN 0080364764.
- [Nuclear Summer https://cornellpress.cornell.edu/book/9781501727979/nuclear-summer/#bookTabs=1 Nuclear Summer]
