= Good Witch (TV series) =

2015–2021 fantasy comedy-drama television series

- Genre: Fantasy comedy drama
- Based on: Characters created by Rod Spence
- Developed by: Craig Pryce; Sue Tenney
- Starring: Catherine Bell; Bailee Madison; James Denton; Catherine Disher; Kylee Evans; Peter MacNeill; Sarah Power; Dan Jeannotte; Rebecca Dalton; Rhys Matthew Bond; Marc Bendavid; Scott Cavalheiro; Katherine Barrell
- Composer: Jack Lenz
- Countries of origin: Canada; United States
- Original language: English
- No. of seasons: 7
- No. of episodes: 75 (list of episodes)

Production
- Executive producers: Catherine Bell; Orly Adelson; Jonathan Eskenas; Frank Siracusa; Craig Pryce; Sue Tenney; Dean Batali; Andrea Raffaghello; Darin Goldberg
- Producers: Ted Miller; Frank Siracusa; Colin Brunton
- Production locations: Hamilton, Ontario, Canada
- Cinematography: John Berrie; Ken Krawczyk
- Editors: Dona Noga; Mark Arcieri; Marc Roussel
- Camera setup: Single-camera
- Running time: 48 minutes
- Production companies: Whizbang Films; ITV Studios America

Original release
- Network: Hallmark Channel
- Release: February 28, 2015 – July 25, 2021

Related
- Good Witch (franchise)

Good Witch is a fantasy comedy drama series that is based on, and continues, a series of television films using variations of the name. Produced by Whizbang Films in association with ITV Studios America and the Hallmark Channel, the series premiered on February 28, 2015, and ran for seven seasons, ending on July 25, 2021.

Catherine Bell, who plays Cassie Nightingale, the titular "good witch" of the film series, both co-produced and starred in the series. The series follows the residents of the fictional town of Middleton, including Cassie and her daughter Grace as they welcome Dr. Sam Radford and his son to town. Cassie and Grace share a gift of enchanted insight and magical intuition. The season 5 finale marked the last regular appearance for Bailee Madison as Grace Russell.

The show made Hallmark network history during the series finale, which featured the first television show same-sex kiss between main characters on the network.

== Series overview ==
Season	Episodes	Originally released	
Season	Episodes	First released	Last released
1	10	February 28, 2015	April 18, 2015
Halloween		October 24, 2015	
2	10	April 17, 2016	June 19, 2016
Secrets of Grey House		October 22, 2016	
3	10	April 30, 2017	July 2, 2017
Spellbound		October 22, 2017	
4	10	April 29, 2018	July 1, 2018
Tale of Two Hearts		October 21, 2018	
5	10	June 9, 2019	August 18, 2019
Curse from a Rose		October 19, 2019	
6	10	May 3, 2020	July 5, 2020
7	10	May 16, 2021	July 25, 2021

As with the previous seven TV movies, the series continues the spirited life of newly widowed Cassie Nightingale, the good-hearted enchantress of the fictional Middleton, with her now-teenaged daughter Grace. When new neighbors, the Radfords, move in next door, they become suspicious of Cassie and her daughter. The dynamics of the series' focus would change during the six seasons, which later saw the Nightingales and Radfords become friendlier and more romantic, leading to Cassie's marrying for the second time, while at the same time shifted to stories involving its residents (including their relationships with others), an ongoing mystery, and a series of curses that tied to Cassie's lineage.

== Cast ==
=== Main ===
- Catherine Bell as Cassandra "Cassie" Nightingale: the mother of Grace Russell and is the owner of a shop called Bell, Book and Candle and runs a bed and breakfast at Grey House. Cassie is psychic and uses her intuition (and at times, a little magic) for good reasons. She marries Sam in the fifth season.
- Bailee Madison as Grace Russell (main seasons 1–5, guest season 7): Cassie's teenaged daughter and younger half-sister of Brandon and Lori who has her own "intuitive charm", similar to her mother. She leaves Middleton to attend college at the end of the fifth season. Madison briefly returned as Grace for a remote cameo appearance in the third episode of season seven.
- James Denton as Dr. Sam Radford: Cassie's handsome neighbor, Nick's dad, and the town's new doctor, he is fairly wealthy from his experiences as a New York trauma surgeon, owner of his own private practice, on multiple hospital boards, and other activities. Sam and Cassie get married in the beginning of season five, serving as a father figure to Grace.
- Sarah Power as Abigail Pershing: Cassie and Grace's cousin, she has her own magical touch similar to Cassie's, but uses it in her own way.
- Catherine Disher as Martha Tinsdale is the mayor of Middleton and a longtime friend of Cassie's.
- Kylee Evans as Stephanie Borden is the owner of a local bistro and a close friend of Cassie.
- Peter MacNeill as George O'Hanrahan is the father-in-law of Cassie's late husband Jake and maternal grandfather of Brandon and Lori. He is a grandfather-figure to Grace and helps operate Grey House Bed and Breakfast with Cassie.
- Rhys Matthew Bond as Nick Radford (main seasons 2–5; recurring seasons 1, 6) is Sam's troublesome son; since arriving in Middleton, he refuses to accept his new home and constantly wishes to go back to New York. Later, he befriends Grace and the two become step siblings in the fifth season.
- Dan Jeannotte as Brandon Russell (main season 2; recurring seasons 1, 3–4; guest season 5): Cassie's stepson and Grace's older half-brother, he married Tara in the seventh movie. He becomes a police officer like his late father, in the first season.
- Ashley Leggat (recurring season 1)/Rebecca Dalton (main season 2; recurring seasons 3–4; guest season 5) as Tara Russell: Brandon's wife, she was formerly a graduate student and worked for Cassie at Bell, Book and Candle. Leggat reprised her role from the film series in the first season, but was replaced by Dalton in season 2.
- Marc Bendavid as Donovan Davenport (seasons 5–7): the mayor of Blairsville and Abigail's love interest.
- Scott Cavalheiro as Adam Hawkins (seasons 5–7): the hospital chaplain and Stephanie's love interest.
- Katherine Barrell as Joy Harper (seasons 6–7): a home renovation designer who comes to Middleton and helps to renovate the Davenport mansion for Martha. She is keeping secrets about her own past, later revealed to be Cassie and Abigail's cousin through her mother Julia, who was Cassie's second cousin. She also has a magical touch and intuition, including an ability to envision dreams.

=== Recurring ===
- Noah Cappe as Derek Sanders (seasons 1–4): Middleton's chief of police, whom Mayor Martha Tinsdale appointed after Cassie's husband Jake died
- Paul Miller as Tom Tinsdale (guest seasons 1, 5; recurring seasons 2–4, 6–7): Martha's husband and previous mayor of Middleton
- Anthony Lemke as Ryan Elliot (recurring season 1; guest season 2) is a realtor and Cassie's friend, although he also harbored romantic feelings for her.
- Hannah Endicott-Douglas as Lori Russell (seasons 1–2): Cassie's stepdaughter, Brandon's younger sister, and Grace's older half-sister, who is now a writer
- Shane Harte as Anthony (season 1): Grace's best friend
- Gabrielle Miller as Linda Wallace (seasons 1–2; guest season 5): Sam's ex-wife and Nick's mother
- Kate Corbett as Eve (seasons 2–4): the receptionist at Dr. Sam Radford's clinic
- Jefferson Brown as Ben Patterson (seasons 2–4): a handyman who opened the Middleton Cinema and Stephanie's former boyfriend
- Dan Payne as John Dover (season 2): Cassie's former college friend, he arrives in Middleton, during the second season, for a teaching job, and renews his interest in dating her.
- Art Hindle as Arthur (seasons 4, 6): Abigail's estranged father
- Sebastian Pigott as Phil Sturgis (season 4): A Grey House guest and creator of a high-tech dating app, he briefly dates Abigail before moving to Portland.
- Gianpaolo Venuta as Vincent (seasons 5, 7): Cassie's world-traveling and adventurous foster brother.
- Paula Boudreau as Dottie Davenport (seasons 5–7): Donovan's mother and Martha's nemesis.
- Lindsey Owen Pierre as Dr. Grant Collins (seasons 6–7): a friend of Sam's who works at the hospital.
- Samora Smallwood as Dr. Monica McBride (season 7): a friend of Sam's who works at the hospital.
- Kyana Teresa as Zoey Taylor (season 7): A firefighter and Joy's love interest

== Production ==
The series is filmed in Toronto, Ontario, primarily at Cinespace Film Studios' Kipling Avenue facility. Many outdoor scenes are filmed in and around Hamilton, Ontario. The Scottish Rite Freemasons Temple in Hamilton stands in for Middleton Town Hall. Street scenes in Middleton are largely filmed on King Street in Dundas Ontario, or the Westdale neighbourhood of Hamilton. Several local landmarks are often seen in the background, such as the historic Collins Hotel, Westdale High School, The Ancaster Old Mill, and the Niagara Escarpment. However, season six had the cast and crew travel to Cambridge, Ontario, to film some pivotal scenes.

As producer Orly Adelson was president of ITV Studios America in 2014, ITV agreed to become the franchise's TV series distributor outside of North America.

== Reception ==
In May 2017, the show placed second for four straight weeks, behind AMC’s Breaking Bad spin-off, Better Call Saul. In 2017, Mike Hale of The New York Times noted that the series has been "ignored by critics and never nominated for an Emmy or a Golden Globe (or any other major television award in the United States)." Hale continued to explain that the "Good Witch, averaging more than 2.5 million viewers on Sunday nights on the Hallmark Channel, consistently beat more talked-about shows such as Fargo, The Americans, Silicon Valley, Veep, and Pretty Little Liars." Hale called the series "a gentle, sentimental primetime fable set in an idealized Middle American small city (not an angsty suburb), is the show you find your parents or grandparents watching when you come home for a visit."

In 2019, the show was one of the network's most popular original series, and the Good Witch closed its season five in first place among household ratings on Sundays. The success of the series lifted the Hallmark Channel to be the highest-rated and most-watched cable network on the weekends. In July 2019, Deadline reported that Hallmark Channel renewed the series for a sixth season, and Bailee Madison would be leaving the show. Deadline wrote that "Madison has been on Good Witch series since it launched in 2015, so her exit is bittersweet and emotional."

== Accolades ==
The show won ASCAP Award for Top Television Series at the 2018 ASCAP Film and Television Music Awards. In 2019, the series was nominated for the Saturn Award for Best Fantasy Television Series.

== Home media ==
On October 13, 2015, Hallmark released the first season of Good Witch on DVD. On October 11, 2016, Hallmark released the second season of Good Witch on DVD, which included the Halloween special, "Good Witch Halloween". On September 24, 2019, Hallmark released the fifth season on DVD. The sixth season was released on October 13, 2020. The first five seasons were made available internationally on Netflix on March 23, 2021. Seasons 6 and 7 were made available on Netflix on September 30, 2021.

Season	DVD release dates	Special features
Season	Region 1	Special features
1	October 13, 2015	
2	October 11, 2016	Good Witch Halloween
3	October 10, 2017	Good Witch: Secrets of Grey House
4	October 2, 2018	Good Witch: Spellbound
5	September 24, 2019	Good Witch: Tale of Two Hearts
6	October 13, 2020	Good Witch: Curse from a Rose
7	October 26, 2021	

=== Box sets ===
Title	DVD release dates	Special features
Title	Region 1	Special features
Good Witch: Seasons 1–3	July 21, 2021	Good Witch Halloween; Good Witch: Secrets of Grey House
