= The Jesse Ventura Story =

- Written by: Patricia Jones; Donald Reiker
- Directed by: David Jackson
- Starring: Nils Allen Stewart; Nancy Anne Sakovich; Thomas Brandise; Christopher Bondy; Nola Augustson; Jef Mallory
- Composer: Richard Gibbs
- Country of origin: United States
- Original language: English

Production
- Producer: Jim Chory
- Cinematography: John Holosko
- Editor: Adam Wolfe
- Running time: 87 minutes
- Production companies: NBC Studios; Davis Entertainment

Original release
- Network: NBC
- Release: May 23, 1999

The Jesse Ventura Story is a 1999 American biographical film directed by David Jackson and written by Patricia Jones and Donald Reiker. The film stars Nils Allen Stewart, Nancy Anne Sakovich, Thomas Brandise, Christopher Bondy, Nola Augustson and Jef Mallory. The film premiered on NBC on May 23, 1999.

== Cast ==
- Nils Allen Stewart as Jesse Ventura
- Nancy Anne Sakovich as Terry Ventura
- Thomas Brandise as Teen Jesse Ventura
- Christopher Bondy as George Janos
- Nola Augustson as Bernice Janos
- Jef Mallory as Teen Tyrell
- Jonathan Potts as Dean
- Elias Zarou as Chaney
- Bobby Johnston as Captain Nice
- Dwight McFee as Norm Coleman
- David Huband as Skip Humphrey
- Phillip Jarrett as Non Com
- Michael Ruperco
- Kevin Rushton as Billy Graham
- Tommy Dorrian
- Bill Goldberg as Luger
- Chris Kanyon as Kanyon / Mortis
