= Scott Cavalheiro =

Canadian actor and filmmaker

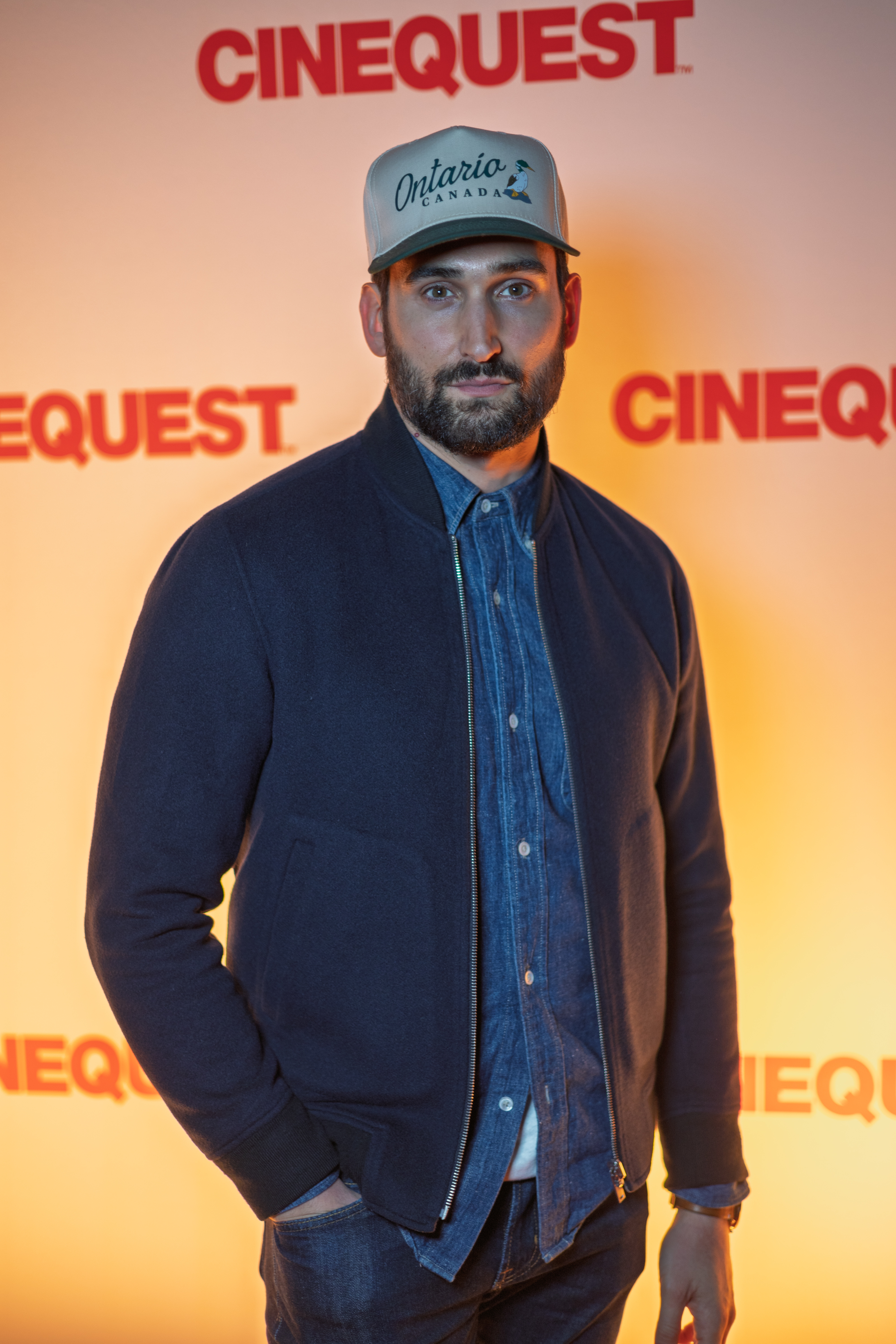
Scott Cavalheiro at Cinequest Film Festival 2026

Scott Anthony Cavalheiro (born June 18, 1987) is a Canadian actor and filmmaker, best known for his regular role as Adam Hawkins on the television series Good Witch.

A native of Bradford, Ontario, he took an acting class in high school, but concentrated primarily on science after the class was cancelled when his school's drama teacher died, and no community theatre program was available to pursue acting outside of school. He took theatre classes in university, also completing a degree in neuroscience at York University. After struggling to establish himself as an actor in his early career, he considered leaving the profession to become a doctor, until being convinced by his friend Tom Cavanagh to stick with acting.

In 2018 he married comedian and actress Claire Stollery, with whom he has collaborated on various projects including the web series Triggered. In the same year, he directed the short film Take Your Mark.

In 2024 he entered production on his feature film directing debut, Plan C. The film premiered at the 2026 Cinequest Film & Creativity Festival, followed by its Canadian premiere at the Canadian Film Festival.

== Filmography ==
=== Film ===
Year	Title	Role	Notes
2009	Domino Effect	Jimmy Brandon	
2009	White Collar Criminals	Gunman #2	
2009	Time to Fire Your Agent	Pirate	
2009	Truth Lies in Charlie	Johnny	
2010	Daylight Savings	Rob	
2012	Friendzone	Eddy	
2012	Anything Goes	James	
2013	A Man Is a Man Is a Man	Hombre	
2013	Shelly	Mr. Flint	
2013	The Bird Men	Darcy	
2014	The Scarehouse	Johnny Dawson	
2015	The Craft	Elliot Greene	
2016	Love in the Age of Like	Ronnie	
2016	Copspeak	Sam	
2016	Rough Hands	Wade	
2017	Love of My Life	Will	
2017	Kill Order	Scientist	
2017	Must Kill Karl	Paulo	
2017	Happy First Birthday Lucretia	MC	
2019	Volcano	Mack	
2019	Resolve	Older Darius	
2020	Anything for Jackson	Colin	
2024	In the Meat House	Eric	
2026	Plan C	Dr. Lazar	Also director

=== Television ===
Year	Title	Role	Notes
2008	Body Language	Lap dance client / Anonymous lover	2 episodes
2009	Forbidden Science	Max	3 episodes
2009	Ghostly Encounters	Rick Lamoureux	1 episode
2010	Cra$h & Burn	Will	1 episode
2011	Flashpoint	Pvt. Jordan	1 episode
2012	Alphas	Cute guy	1 episode
2012	Saving Hope	Male doctor	1 episode
2012-2024	Space Janitors	Squall trooper / Kostya the Nemerdian poet	7 episodes
2013	Satisfaction	Fireman	2 episodes
2014	Hemlock Grove	Cop	1 episode
2014	Air Crash Investigation	Orangel Lozada	1 episode
2014	Lost Girl	Tad	1 episode
2015	Man Seeking Woman	Charlie	1 episode
2015	On the Twelfth Day of Christmas	Ryan Gallagher	TV movie
2016	True Dating Stories	Victoria's date	1 episode
2016	The Epitaph	Luke Evans	TV movie
2017	Ransom	Bradley Blair	2 episodes
2017	What Would Sal Do?	Darryl	Series regular
2017	Epic Studios	James Marsden	6 episodes
2017	The Indian Detective	Rocco Farinelli	4 episodes
2017-2019	Mary Kills People	Det. Craig Hull	9 episodes
2018	Schitt's Creek	Miguel	1 episode
2018	In Contempt	Derek	2 episodes
2018	Christmas with a View	Shane	TV movie
2018	No Sleep 'Til Christmas	Simon Mousley	TV movie
2019	Hudson & Rex	Lucas Arbec	2 episodes
2019	Carter	Mark	1 episode
2019-2021	Good Witch	Adam Hawkins	31 episodes; series regular seasons 5-7
2020	The Wedding Planners	Jon	1 episode
2020	Avocado Toast	Hunter	5 episodes
2024	One More Time	Eddie	5 episodes
