= List of Psi Factor: Chronicles of the Paranormal episodes =

Psi Factor: Chronicles of the Paranormal is a Canadian science fiction drama television series which was filmed in and around Toronto, Ontario, Canada, and aired 88 episodes over four seasons from 1996 to 2000. The series is hosted by Dan Aykroyd who presents dramatic stories supposedly inspired by the paranormal investigations of the "Office of Scientific Investigation and Research" (O.S.I.R.).

In the first season, most episodes feature two separate cases, except for two episodes that are exceptions to this format. Starting from the second season, each episode shifts to focusing on a single case. Additionally, the series introduces story arcs that run across multiple episodes, alongside the standalone cases.

== Series overview ==
Season	Episodes	Originally released	
Season	Episodes	First released	Last released
1	22	September 28, 1996	May 17, 1997
2	22	September 29, 1997	May 18, 1998
3	22	September 27, 1998	May 23, 1999
4	22	September 26, 1999	May 20, 2000

== Episodes ==
=== Season 1 (1996–97) ===
No. overall	No. in season	Title	Directed by	Written by	Original release date
1	1	"Dream House" "UFO Encounter"	Allan Kroeker	Will Dixon James Nadler	September 28, 1996
2	2	"Possession" "Man Out of Time"	John Bell Allan Kroeker	James Nadler Larry Raskin	October 5, 1996
3	3	"Reptilian Revenge" "Ghostly Voices"	Giles Walker Allan Kroeker	Will Dixon Richard Oleksiak	October 12, 1996
4	4	"Creeping Darkness" "Power"	John Bell Allan Kroeker	David Preston Gerald Wexler	October 19, 1996
5	5	"Free Fall" "Presence"	Milan Cheylov John Bell	Larry Raskin Ian Weir	October 26, 1996
6	6	"The Infestation" "Human Apportation"	Giles Walker John Bell	Damian Kindler Denise Fordham	November 2, 1996
7	7	"The Underneath" "Phantom Limb"	Milan Cheylov Allan Kroeker	Robert C. Cooper Sherman Snukal	November 9, 1996
8	8	"The Transient" "Two Lost Old Men"	Giles Walker	Damian Kindler Ian Weir	November 16, 1996
9	9	"UFO Duplication" "Clara's Friend"	Marc Voizard	Robert C. Cooper Will Dixon	November 23, 1996
10	10	"The Hunter" "The Healer"	John Bell	Damian Kindler Larry Raskin	November 30, 1996
11	11	"The Curse" "Angel on a Plane"	Marc Voizard Ken Girotti	Will Dixon Ian Weir	January 18, 1997
12	12	"Anasazi Cave" "Devil's Triangle"	Marc Voizard Ken Girotti	Sherman Snukal Damian Kindler	January 25, 1997
13	13	"The Undead" "The Stalker"	Clay Boris	Will Dixon Alex Pugsley	February 1, 1997
14	14	"The Forbidden North" "Reincarnation"	Ken Girotti	Damian Kindler Peter Aykroyd	February 8, 1997
15	15	"The Greenhouse Effect" "The Buzz"	Clay Boris	Damian Kindler Sherman Snukal	February 15, 1997
16	16	"The Light"	Milan Cheylov	Will Dixon	February 22, 1997
17	17	"The 13th Floor" "The Believer"	Clay Boris Craig Pryce	Jean Hurtubise Damian Kindler	April 12, 1997
18	18	"The Fog" "House on Garden Street"	Clay Boris	Robert C. Cooper Chris Dickie	April 19, 1997
19	19	"Second Sight" "Chocolate Soldier"	Milan Cheylov	Sherman Snukal Will Dixon	April 26, 1997
20	20	"Fire Within" "Fate"	Aaron Schuster	Richard Oleksiak Damian Kindler	May 3, 1997
21	21	"Death at Sunset" "Collision"	Ross Clyde	Jeremy Hole Sherman Snukal	May 10, 1997
22	22	"Perestroika"	Giles Walker	Will Dixon	May 17, 1997

=== Season 2 (1997–98) ===
No. overall	No. in season	Title	Directed by	Written by	Original release date
23	1	"Threads"	Milan Cheylov	James Nadler	September 29, 1997
24	2	"The Donor"	Milan Cheylov	Rick Drew	October 6, 1997
25	3	"Wish I May"	John Bell	Will Dixon	October 13, 1997
26	4	"Communion"	John Bell	Peter Mohan	October 20, 1997
27	5	"Frozen in Time"	Giles Walker	Tracey Forbes	October 27, 1997
28	6	"Devolution"	Clay Boris	John Dolin	November 3, 1997
29	7	"The Warrior"	Clay Boris	Rick Drew	November 10, 1997
30	8	"The Grey Men"	Giles Walker	James Nadler	November 17, 1997
31	9	"Man of War"	Stephen Williams	Deborah Nathan	November 24, 1997
32	10	"The Damned"	Clay Boris	Toni Di Franco	December 1, 1997
33	11	"Hell Week"	Craig Pryce	Alex Pugsley	January 26, 1998
34	12	"The Edge"	Craig Pryce	Tracey Forbes	February 2, 1998
35	13	"Bad Dreams"	Stephen Williams	Will Dixon	February 9, 1998
36	14	"Kiss of the Tiger"	Carl Goldstein	Damian Kindler	February 17, 1998
37	15	"The Haunting"	John Bell	Rick Drew	February 23, 1998
38	16	"Night of the Setting Sun"	E. Jane Thompson	James Nadler	March 2, 1998
39	17	"The Labyrinth"	Ron Oliver	Christiane Schull	April 13, 1998
40	18	"Pentimento"	Vincenzo Natali	Sarah Dodd	April 20, 1998
41	19	"Frozen Faith"	Ron Oliver	Matt Frewer	April 27, 1998
42	20	"Map to the Stars"	John Bell	Will Dixon	May 4, 1998
43	21	"The Endangered"	Rick Drew	Will Dixon	May 11, 1998
44	22	"The Egress (Part 1)"	John Bell	James Nadler	May 18, 1998

=== Season 3 (1998–99) ===
No. overall	No. in season	Title	Directed by	Written by	Original release date
45	1	"Jaunt (Part 2)"	John Bell	James Nadler	September 27, 1998
46	2	"Comings and Goings (Part 3)"	John Bell	Tracey Forbes	October 4, 1998
47	3	"Heartland"	Stephen Williams	John Dolin	October 11, 1998
48	4	"The Kiss"	Doug Jackson	C.D. Frewer & F.J. Kennedy	October 18, 1998
49	5	"Absolution"	Clay Boris	Damian Kindler	October 25, 1998
50	6	"All Hallows Eve"	Luc Chalifour	Donald Martin	November 1, 1998
51	7	"Palimpsest"	Craig Pryce	Paula Smith	November 8, 1998
52	8	"Return"	Bruce Pittman	James Nadler	November 15, 1998
53	9	"Harlequin"	Ron Oliver	Larry Raskin	November 22, 1998
54	10	"Little People"	Craig Pryce	Rick Drew	November 29, 1998
55	11	"The Winding Cloth"	Clay Boris	Rick Drew	January 24, 1999
56	12	"Chango"	Bruce Pittman	Sarah Dodd	January 31, 1999
57	13	"Solitary Confinement"	Ron Oliver	Story by : John Dolin & Michael Teversham; Teleplay by : John Dolin	February 7, 1999
58	14	"Valentine"	Ross Clyde	Sheila Prescott-Vessey	February 14, 1999
59	15	"Old Wounds"	Luc Chalifour	Story by : Jim Purdy; Teleplay by : Jim Purdy & Paula Smith	February 21, 1999
60	16	"The Observer Effect"	Giles Walker	Damian Kindler	February 28, 1999
61	17	"School of Thought"	John Bell	Rick Drew	April 18, 1999
62	18	"Y2K"	Ron Oliver	C.D. Frewer & F.J. Kennedy	April 25, 1999
63	19	"The Tribunal"	John Bell	Jean Hurtubise	May 2, 1999
64	20	"John Doe"	Giles Walker	Damian Kindler	May 9, 1999
65	21	"Forever and a Day (Part 1)"	Ron Oliver	James Nadler	May 16, 1999
66	22	"Forever and a Day (Part 2)"	Stephen Williams	James Nadler	May 23, 1999

=== Season 4 (1999–2000) ===
No. overall	No. in season	Title	Directed by	Written by	Original release date
67	1	"Shocking"	Stephen Williams	Larry Raskin	September 26, 1999
68	2	"Sacrifices"	Stephen Williams	Will Dixon	October 3, 1999
69	3	"Happy Birthday, Matt Praeger"	Luc Chalifour	Larry Raskin	October 10, 1999
70	4	"Soul Survivor"	Ross Clyde	Rick Drew	October 17, 1999
71	5	"883"	Ron Oliver	Damian Kindler	October 24, 1999
72	6	"Once Upon a Time in the West"	John Bell	Damian Kindler	October 31, 1999
73	7	"Body and Soul"	John Bell	Andrea Moodie	November 7, 1999
74	8	"Temple of Light"	Ron Oliver	Andrea Moodie	November 14, 1999
75	9	"Inertia"	Randy Bradshaw	Will Dixon	November 21, 1999
76	10	"Nocturnal Cabal"	Steve DiMarco	Damian Kindler	November 28, 1999
77	11	"'Til Death Do Us Part"	Luc Chalifour	Sarah Dodd	January 22, 2000
78	12	"Tyler/Tim"	Randy Bradshaw	Rick Drew	January 29, 2000
79	13	"Super Sargasso Sea"	Larry McLean	Andrea Moodie	February 5, 2000
80	14	"Persistence of Vision"	Ron Oliver	Will Dixon	February 12, 2000
81	15	"GeoCore"	Jon Cassar	Martin M Boricky	February 19, 2000
82	16	"Gone Fishing"	Ron Oliver	Larry Raskin & Aaron Woodley	February 26, 2000
83	17	"Chiaroscuro"	Alan Gough	Andrea Moodie	April 15, 2000
84	18	"Regeneration"	Will Dixon	Damian Kindler	April 22, 2000
85	19	"Wendigo"	John Bell	Mark Leiren-Young	April 29, 2000
86	20	"Elevator"	Ron Oliver	Larry Raskin	May 6, 2000
87	21	"Force Majeure"	John Bell	Will Dixon & Damian Kindler	May 13, 2000
88	22	"Stone Dreams"	Ron Oliver	Larry Raskin & Andrea Moodie	May 20, 2000
