= Nancy Anne Sakovich =

Canadian actress and former model (born 1961)

- Born: October 8, 1961 (age 63); Belleville, Ontario, Canada
- Occupation(s): Actress, model
- Years active: 1989–2004

Nancy Anne Sakovich (born October 8, 1961) is a Canadian actress and former model.

== Life and career ==
Sakovich grew up in Ottawa, Ontario, and attended Laurentian High School. She began modeling locally as a teenager.
In 1981, she started studying at Trent University (Ontario) and earned a degree in biology.
Discovered by the Elite Modeling Agency, she traveled the world as an international model, moving first to New York, then settling in Europe where for three years she graced covers and runways in Germany, Italy, France and England.
Back in Canada, she appeared on various TV commercials, including Jamieson Vitamins and a series of commercials for the Canadian Imperial Bank of Commerce.
After modeling, Sakovich turned to acting. She did a commercial for a large auto maker, and began doing guest roles for TV shows like CBC's Street Legal. She quickly landed roles in variety of TV productions, including a title role in Golden Will: The Silken Laumann Story, recurring roles on TV shows Katts and Dog, Relic Hunter, and Doc, and a major secondary role in Category 6: Day of Destruction.
She also presented the 10th Gemini Awards(1996) as a host, and participated in the MPICA's "Light, Camera, Auction" annual charity event in 2002.
Sakovich is most famous for her role as the series lead, senior data analyst Lindsay Donner, in the TV series Psi Factor: Chronicles of the Paranormal.

She now lives in Toronto, Ontario.

== Partial filmography ==
Year	Title	Role	Notes
2001–2004	Doc	Dr. Kate Weston	(TV) 6 episodes
2004	Category 6: Day of Destruction	Jane Benson	
2003	The Crooked E: The Unshredded Truth About Enron	Liz Perry	
2002	Queer as Folk	Leda	(TV) 7 episodes
2000–2001	Relic Hunter	Cate Hemphill	(TV) 3 episodes
1996–2000	PSI Factor: Chronicles of the Paranormal	Lindsay Donner	(TV)
1999	The Jesse Ventura Story	Terry	
1996	Golden Will: The Silken Laumann Story	Silken Laumann	(TV)
1995	The Commish		(TV) Off Broadway: Part 2
1994	Kung Fu: The Legend Continues	Devon	(TV) Magic Trick
1994	And Then There was One	Lena Burns	(TV)
1991	Sweating Bullets	Wanda	(TV) 1 episode
1991	Material World	Pam	(TV) 1 episode
