= Paul Miller (actor) =

Canadian actor (born 1960)

- Born: Paul Douglas Miller; October 30, 1960 (age 64); Montreal, Quebec, Canada
- Occupation: Actor
- Years active: 1989-Present

Paul Miller is a Canadian actor, best known for playing Connor Doyle on the TV series Psi Factor.

Miller graduated from London Central High School in England in 1978, and from Montreal's National Theatre School in 1987.

He has appeared on many movies and TV shows including a recurring role in Traders, a lead role in the short film Roadkill Travelogue, and many guest appearances in such shows as Due South, Goosebumps, Sue Thomas: F.B.Eye, and Friday the 13th. Miller also voiced Klaymoor in the video game, Mega Man Legends 2.

He played the recurring role of Tom Tinsdale in the Hallmark Channel series Good Witch.

Miller is also a veteran stage actor. He used to be a member of the Stratford Festival and has performed in many Shakespeare's stages, such as Hamlet, Othello, Romeo & Juliet, and Much Ado About Nothing. He also played the title role in Moises Kaufman's Gross Indecency: The Three Trials of Oscar Wilde, and the role of MacDuff in HurlyBurly Theatre Company's production of Macbeth.

He is a lover of animals and the outdoors and plays several instruments, including the acoustic guitar. He has two sisters. The actor lives in Toronto, Ontario.
