= The Best of Dave Mason (1981 album) =

Greatest hits album by Dave Mason
- Released: 1981
- Genre: Rock
- Length: 41:20
- Label: Columbia

Dave Mason chronology
Old Crest on a New Wave (1980)	The Best of Dave Mason (1981)	Two Hearts (1987)

Professional ratings
Review scores
Source	Rating
Allmusic	3/5 stars

The Best Of Dave Mason is a 1981 album by English musician Dave Mason and was released on LP and cassette on the Columbia Records label. It was released on compact disc in 1986 and remastered for a 2010 CD in Japan. Allmusic's retrospective review criticized the album as it "did not live up to its name entirely". The reason for this is the selection of songs present on the record, as well as it not being comprehensive enough.

== Track listing ==
All tracks are written by Dave Mason, unless otherwise noted.

No.	Title	Writer(s)	Original album	Length
1.	"Let It Go, Let It Flow"		Let It Flow (1977)	3:17
2.	"So High (Rock Me Baby and Roll Me Away)"	Jack Conrad; Mentor Williams	Let It Flow	4:10
3.	"Show Me Some Affection"		Dave Mason (1974)	4:19
4.	"Will You Still Love Me Tomorrow"	Gerry Goffin; Carole King	Mariposa De Oro (1978)	5:05
5.	"All Along the Watchtower"	Bob Dylan	Dave Mason	4:02
6.	"We Just Disagree"	Jim Krueger	Let It Flow	3:03
7.	"Paralyzed"	Stephen Holsapple; Chuck Kavooras; Fred Marrone; Robert Marrone	Old Crest on a New Wave (1980)	3:38
8.	"Every Woman"		It's Like You Never Left (1973)	3:02
9.	"Only You Know And I Know"		Alone Together (1970)	4:23
10.	"Feelin' Alright?"		Headkeeper (1972)	6:21
Total length:				41:20
