= The Best of Dave Mason =

The Best of Dave Mason is the name of two albums by Dave Mason, including:

- The Best of Dave Mason (1974 album)
- The Best of Dave Mason (1981 album)
