= Two Hearts (Dave Mason album) =

Studio album by Dave Mason
- Released: 1987
- Studios: West Oaks Records (Westlake Village, California); Woodland Studios (Nashville, Tennessee); Granny's House (Reno, Nevada)
- Genres: Rock, pop
- Length: 34:34
- Label: MCA
- Producers: Jimmy Hotz; Dave Mason

Dave Mason chronology
Old Crest on a New Wave (1980)	Two Hearts (1987)	Some Assembly Required (1987)

Professional ratings
Review scores
Source	Rating
AllMusic	3/5 stars
The Encyclopedia of Popular Music	1/5 stars
MusicHound Rock: The Essential Album Guide	2/5 stars

Two Hearts is the tenth studio album by English singer Dave Mason, released in 1987 on MCA Records.

== Overview ==
Steve Winwood and Phoebe Snow perform on the album.

== Singles ==
As a single "Something in the Heart" rose to No. 24 on the Billboard Mainstream Rock chart. "Dreams I Dream", featuring Phoebe Snow, also reached No. 11 on the Billboard Adult Contemporary Songs chart.

== Track listing ==
Track listing adapted from album's text.

No.	Title	Writer(s)	Length
1.	"Two Hearts"	Dave Mason	4:42
2.	"Just a Little Lovin'"	Dave Mason, Dan Haggerty	4:26
3.	"Forever"	Dave Mason	4:29
4.	"Dreams I Dream" (featuring Phoebe Snow)	Pam Neswick, Steve Werful	4:22
5.	"Something in the Heart"	Dave Mason	3:25
6.	"Ballerina"	Dave Mason	4:19
7.	"Fighting for Love"	Dave Mason	4:16
8.	"Replace the Face"	Alan O' Day	4:22
Total length:			34:34

== Personnel ==
Credits adapted from album's text.

- Dave Mason – vocals, acoustic piano (1), guitars (1, 2), drum programming, guitar solo (4), additional vocals (6), lead guitar (8)
- Mike Lawler – synthesizers (1–4, 7), bass (1–4, 7), electric piano (2, 3), horns (2, 4, 8), slide guitar (6, 7), keyboards (8)
- Steve Winwood – backing vocals (1), Hammond organ (3), synthesizers (5), organ (7)
- Peter Seibert – keyboards (5, 6, 8), bass (5), horns (8)
- Kenny Lee Lewis – rhythm guitar (8)
- Larry Cohen – bass (6, 8), "jocko" bass (6)
- Jimmy Hotz – drum programming
- Bobbye Hall – percussion (4)
- Mike Finnigan – backing vocals (2, 3, 5, 8), additional vocals (6)
- Steve Neives – backing vocals (2, 8), saxophone (3), additional vocals (6)
- Phoebe Snow – backing vocals (3–5), vocals (4)

== Production ==
- Dave Mason – producer, art direction
- Jimmy Hotz – producer, engineer, mixing
- Don Evans – assistant engineer
- Tim Farmer – assistant engineer
- Bjorn Thorsrud – assistant engineer
- Steve Hall – mastering at Future Disc (Hollywood, California)
- Jeff Adamoff – art direction
- Michael Diehl – design
- Dennis Keeley – photography
- Jack Kellman – management
