= Tietgen =

Tietgen is a surname. Notable people with the surname include:

- Carl Frederik Tietgen (1829–1901), Danish financier and industrialist
  - SS C.F. Tietgen, ship named after the merchant
- Lane Tietgen, American poet, composer and musician
