= Here & Now (America album) =

Studio album by America
- Released: January 16, 2007
- Recorded: June – July 2006
- Studio: Stratosphere Sound, New York City, New York
- Genre: Soft rock
- Length: 1:24:44
- Label: Burgundy
- Producer: Adam Schlesinger, James Iha

America chronology
The Grand Cayman Concert (2002)	Here & Now (2007)	Live In Concert: Wildwood Springs (2008)

Professional ratings
Review scores
Source	Rating
AllMusic	4/5 stars
Music Box	2.5/5 stars
Pitchfork	4.0/10

Here & Now is the 16th original studio album by American folk rock duo America, released by Burgundy Records in January 2007. This is the first pop music studio album released by the group since Human Nature in 1998 (the group released a Christmas-themed studio album in 2002, Holiday Harmony). The album reached number 52 on the Billboard albums chart, America's best chart showing since 1982's View from the Ground. Songs that received some airplay in the U.S. were "Always Love", "Love and Leaving", "Chasing the Rainbow", and "Ride On".

== History ==
The personnel involved in the recording and production of Here & Now departs sharply from previous projects and represents an effort to reconnect with fresh, young talent. The album is co-produced by James Iha (of The Smashing Pumpkins) and Adam Schlesinger (of Fountains of Wayne and Ivy). Guest artists include Ryan Adams, Ben Kweller, Jim James and Patrick Hallahan of My Morning Jacket, Matthew Caws and Ira Elliot of Nada Surf, Mark Rozzo of Maplewood, and longtime collaborator and friend Stephen Bishop. Veteran America drummer Will Leacox joins in on percussion. Cover songs include "Indian Summer" (Maplewood), "Golden" (My Morning Jacket), and "Always Love" (Nada Surf).

The recording sessions were completed in July 2006, but a scheduled September release was eventually pushed back to January 2007. This was the first known occasion on which America recorded in a studio in New York City. The album reached No. 52 in its debut week, the highest position for the band since 1982's View from the Ground.

The first disc is composed of brand-new studio recordings, while a second disc features a live performance of the entire History: America's Greatest Hits album as recorded for "Then...Again...Live!" on XM Satellite Radio, with longtime sidemen Willie Leacox on drums, Michael Woods on guitar and keyboards, and newcomer Richard Campbell on bass and vocals.

Several alternate editions of Here & Now exist with a bonus track added at the end of disc one. These editions could only be purchased at Best Buy, Borders, Wal-Mart, and via iTunes digital download. A version sold at Target included a bonus DVD containing eight tracks of the XM performance.

Of the bonus tracks, the title song and "Saturday Sky" originally appeared on Gerry Beckley's solo record Horizontal Fall (also the original source for "Love and Leaving"), while "Paradise" premiered on The Complete Greatest Hits.

== Track listing ==
Disc one

No.	Title	Writer(s)	Length
1.	"Chasing the Rainbow"	Gerry Beckley	3:19
2.	"Indian Summer"	Mark Rozzo, Dewey Bunnell	3:26
3.	"One Chance"	Beckley	4:27
4.	"Golden"	Jim James	4:18
5.	"Always Love"	Matthew Caws, Ira Elliot, Daniel Lorca	3:25
6.	"Ride On"	Bunnell, Adam Schlesinger	4:02
7.	"Love and Leaving"	Beckley, Bill Mumy	3:40
8.	"Look at Me Now"	Beckley	4:06
9.	"This Time"	Beckley, Bunnell	4:00
10.	"Work to Do"	Schlesinger	2:54
11.	"All I Think About Is You"	Beckley	2:22
12.	"Walk in the Woods"	Bunnell	4:11

13. "Glass King" (iTunes & Australian CD Edition-exclusive bonus track)
13. "Paradise" (Borders-exclusive bonus track)
13. "Saturday Sky" (Walmart-exclusive bonus track)
13. "Here & Now" (Best Buy-exclusive bonus track)

Disc two

No.	Title	Writer(s)	Length
1.	"Ventura Highway"	Bunnell	3:45
2.	"Don't Cross the River"	Dan Peek	2:25
3.	"Daisy Jane"	Beckley	3:02
4.	"I Need You"	Beckley	2:32
5.	"Tin Man"	Bunnell	3:46
6.	"Muskrat Love"	Willis Alan Ramsey	3:07
7.	"Woman Tonight"	D. Peek	2:28
8.	"Only in Your Heart"	Beckley	3:04
9.	"Lonely People"	D. Peek, Catherine Peek	2:19
10.	"Sandman"	Bunnell	6:23
11.	"Sister Golden Hair"	Beckley	3:25
12.	"A Horse with No Name"	Bunnell	4:18

Bonus DVD (Target exclusive)

1. "Ventura Highway"
2. "Daisy Jane"
3. "I Need You"
4. "Tin Man"
5. "Only in Your Heart"
6. "Sandman"
7. "Sister Golden Hair"
8. "A Horse With No Name"
