= Dave Mason Is Alive =

Live album by Dave Mason
- Released: 30 April 1973
- Recorded: 1971
- Venues: The Troubadour, West Hollywood
- Genre: Rock
- Label: Blue Thumb
- Producers: Dave Mason, Tommy LiPuma

Dave Mason chronology
Headkeeper (1972)	Dave Mason Is Alive (1973)	It's Like You Never Left (1973)

Professional ratings
Review scores
Source	Rating
Allmusic	2/5 stars
Christgau's Record Guide	C−

Dave Mason Is Alive is the first album of live recordings by Dave Mason. Recorded in 1971 at the Troubadour club in Los Angeles, the album was released in 1973 by Blue Thumb Records. It has been re-released by MCA Coral (MCA 713).

== Background ==
As reported by William Ruhlmann of AllMusic, the album was released without Mason's approval. Its release by Blue Thumb was prompted by the dispute between it and Mason, a dispute that started midway during the recording of Mason's previous album. That previous album, Headkeeper, had been intended to be a double album, with one disk composed of live recordings made at the Troubador and the other of studio recordings. But after Mason ceased work and took possession of some of the studio masters, Blue Thumb released Headkeeper as a single album, one side live and one side studio recordings. As the dispute with Mason continued, Blue Thumb issued Dave Mason Is Alive, composed entirely of recordings from the same live performance that had been used for Headkeeper. Of the seven tracks on Alive, two of them, "Feelin' Alright" and "Just a Song", are repeated from Headkeeper.

== Track listing ==
All tracks composed by Dave Mason, except where indicated.

=== Side one ===
1. "Walk to the Point" - 4:15
2. "Shouldn't Have Took More than You Gave" - 5:20
3. "Look at You Look at Me" (Mason, Jim Capaldi) - 8:18

=== Side two ===
1. "Only You Know and I Know" - 4:12
2. "Sad and Deep as You" - 4:00
3. "Just a Song" - 3:14
4. "Feelin' Alright" - 5:54

== Personnel ==
- Dave Mason - electric and acoustic guitar, vocals
- Felix Falcon aka "Flaco" - conga and percussion
- "Dr." Rick Jaeger - drums
- Mark T. Jordan - keyboards
- Lonnie Turner - bass

== Production ==
- Produced by Tommy LiPuma and Dave Mason
- Compiled by Tommy LiPuma
- Recording and mixing engineer - Al Schmitt
- Remote equipment by Wally Helder and crew - Miles Weiner, Terry Stark, Chris Chigaridas
- Graphics and photography – Barry Feinstein, Camouflage Productions, Vicki Hodgetts
- Photograph of Dave Mason - Jim Marshall
