= Split Coconut =

Studio album by Dave Mason
- Released: 19 September 1975
- Genre: Rock
- Label: Columbia
- Producers: Bruce Botnick, Dave Mason

Dave Mason chronology
The Best Of Dave Mason (1974)	Split Coconut (1975)	Certified Live (1976)

Split Coconut is the fifth solo studio album by Dave Mason, released in September 1975. It was reissued on CD on the One Way label in 1995.

== Reception ==
Professional ratings
Review scores
Source	Rating
Allmusic	2/5 stars

Allmusic's brief retrospective review called the album a major disappointment after Mason's first two albums for Columbia, claiming that the songs seem both hastily written and hastily recorded.

== Track listing ==
All songs by Dave Mason unless otherwise noted.

Side One

1. "Split Coconut"
2. "Crying, Waiting, Hoping" (Buddy Holly)
3. "You Can Lose It" (Dave Mason, Jim Krueger)
4. "She's a Friend"
5. "Save Your Love"

Side Two

1. "Give Me a Reason Why"
2. "Two Guitar Lovers" (Maureen Gray)
3. "Sweet Music"
4. "Long Lost Friend"

== Personnel ==
- Dave Mason – vocals, guitar, slide guitar
- Jim Krueger – guitar
- Graham Nash – guitar, background vocals
- Gerald Johnson – bass
- Mark T. Jordan – organ, keyboards, clavinet
- Jai Winding – organ, synthesizer, piano, keyboards
- Rick Jaeger – drums
- Emil Richards – percussion, marimba
- The Manhattan Transfer – vocals, background vocals
- David Crosby – vocals, background vocals

== Chart positions ==
Year	Chart	Position
1975	Billboard Pop Albums	27
