= Lane Tietgen =

American poet, composer, and musician (died 2020)

Lane Tietgen (born Topeka, Kansas) was an American poet, composer and musician who sang and played guitar and bass. Tietgen lived in the Bay Area in California. He died on 14 July 2020, as reported in the Sonoma News

A number of Tietgen's songs have been covered by famous musicians, including "Captain Bobby Stout" and "Martha's Madman" by Manfred Mann's Earth Band, "Early Bird Cafe" by John Mellencamp, "It Can't Make Any Difference to Me" by Dave Mason, and "Red and Black Blues" by Ringo Starr. In 2006 Ice Cube used a melody by Tietgen for his song, "Click, Clack – Get Back!," on the album Laugh Now, Cry Later.

Tietgen began his musical career as the guitarist and primary songwriter for The Serfs, who achieved some fame in and around the band's home state of Kansas. In 1970, the blues-jazz-rock band, The Jerry Hahn Brotherhood, recorded seven Tietgen compositions, including "Captain Bobby Stout", "Early Bird Cafe", and "Martha's Madman". The Jerry Hahn Brotherhood featured Hahn, Mike Finnigan, Clyde Graves and George Marsh.

In 2009 The Serfs were inducted into the Kansas Music Hall of Fame. That same year, Tietgen released a solo album, Wheels of Fortune, featuring all original songs.

Tietgen regularly performed live as a folk singer and guitarist in music venues.

== Discography ==
Selection

=== The Serfs, Bread and Water ===
45, Rhythm &. Soul, 1965 https://www.youtube.com/watch?v=LoViibn3f9U

=== The Serfs, Early Bird Cafe ===
Capitol Records, 1969. Lane was a member of this band, wrote several of the songs, and sang on some as well, including the title tune. https://www.youtube.com/watch?v=KafGsY8cM64

=== The Jerry Hahn Brotherhood ===
Seven of the ten songs were written by Lane Tietgen:

1. "Martha's Madman"
2. "Early Bird Cafe"
3. "One Man Woman"
4. "Time's Caught Up With You"
5. "Thursday Thing"
6. "What I Gave Away"
7. "Captain Bobby Stout"

=== Lane Tietgen: Wheels of Fortune ===
Folk-rock record of Lane Tietgen, published in 2009

Artists

- Lane Tietgen: Accordion, Bass, Composer, Executive Producer, Guitar (Acoustic), Harmonica, Horn Arrangements, Mandolin, Organ, Slide Guitar, Trombone, Vocals, Wah Wah Guitar
- Adam "Bagel" Berkowitz: Associate Producer, Drums, Engineer, Mixing, Percussion
- Stephen Hart: Mastering
- Terry Ann Gillette: violin

Songs:

1. "Wheel of Fortune"
2. "Deep Waters of the Heart"
3. "Sweet Alchemy"
4. "Some Call It Evil"
5. "My Heart's One Desire"
6. "Love and Redemption"
7. "Raindrops On the Page"
8. "Eight-Ball Blues"
9. "Mama Bring That Good Thing Over Here"
10. "MLK Riot 1968"

== Links ==
- Lane Tietgens Discography on discogs.com
- Kenny Bloomquist and Lane Tietgen accept the Kansas Music Hall of Fame award., YouTube-Video
