= Dave Mason: Live at Sunrise =

Dave Mason: Live At Sunrise
- Starring: Dave Mason
- Release date: 2002
- Running time: 66 minutes
- Country: United States

Dave Mason: Live At Sunrise was recorded at the Sunrise Musical Theater in Sunrise, Florida, and released by Image Entertainment in 2002. The 66 minute DVD is the first video release for Mason since his 1981 Laserdisc release Dave Mason - Live At Perkins Palace. This performance was also released as an audio-only CD that same year.

Executive Producers

- Pierre Lamoureux
- Barry Ehrman
- Enliven Entertainment LLC

Producer

- Dave Mason

Co-Producer and Mix Engineer

- Phil Bonanno

Performers

- Dave Mason - Vocals & Guitar
- Richard Campbell - Bass Guitar, Vocals
- Johnne Sambataro - Rhythm Guitar, Vocals
- Bobby Scumaci - Keyboards, Vocals
- Greg Babcock - Drums

Songs

- "Let It Go, Let It Flow"
- "Only You Know and I Know"
- "World In Changes"
- "We Just Disagree"
- "40,000 Headmen"
- "Look At You, Look At Me"
- "Dear Mr. Fantasy"
- "All Along the Watchtower"
- "Feelin' Alright?"
