= The Best of Dave Mason (1974 album) =

Greatest hits album by Dave Mason
- Released: 1974
- Genre: Rock
- Label: Blue Thumb
- Producer: Tommy LiPuma and Dave Mason

Dave Mason chronology
Dave Mason (1974)	The Best of Dave Mason (1974)	Split Coconut (1975)

The Best Of Dave Mason is a 1974 album by Dave Mason and was released on the Blue Thumb Records label.

== Reception ==
Professional ratings
Review scores
Source	Rating
Allmusic	3/5 stars
Christgau's Record Guide	C−

Allmusic's retrospective review criticised the selection of songs as downright poor for a "best of" compilation, and accused Blue Thumb Records of releasing the album "apparently with no goal other than to confuse record buyers and distract attention from Mason's new releases on Columbia."

== Track listing ==
1. "A Heartache, A Shadow, A Lifetime"
2. "Only You And I Know"
3. "Can't Stop Worrying, Can't Stop Loving"
4. "Look At You Look At Me"
5. "Walk To The Point"
6. "In My Mind"
7. "To Be Free"
8. "Here We Go Again"
9. "Shouldn't Have Took More Than You Gave"
