= Headkeeper =

Studio album by Dave Mason
- Released: February 1972
- Recorded: 1972
- Venues: The Troubadour, West Hollywood
- Studios: Sunset Sound, Hollywood
- Genre: Rock
- Label: Blue Thumb
- Producers: Dave Mason, Tommy LiPuma

Dave Mason chronology
Dave Mason & Cass Elliot (1971)	Headkeeper (1972)	Dave Mason Is Alive (1973)

Professional ratings
Review scores
Source	Rating
Allmusic	3/5 stars
Christgau's Record Guide	C
Encyclopedia of Popular Music	3/5 stars

Headkeeper is the second solo album by Dave Mason. Originally released on Blue Thumb Records as Blue Thumb 34 (a subsidiary of Famous Music Group) in 1972, Headkeeper was reissued by MCA Records as MCA 712, then reissued on CD in 1988 as MCAD-31326).

== Recording and release ==
In late 1971, Mason began recording Headkeeper. He envisioned a double album with one disk containing new studio recordings and the other live recordings with his new band. The live tracks had been recorded at some highly regarded dates at the Troubadour club in Los Angeles.

Mason thought that since he was Blue Thumb's most successful artist, they should renegotiate his contract. When they refused, he slipped into the studio and took the master tapes of the recordings made to date.

Producer Tommy LiPuma then assembled an album from two-track safety masters that Mason did not take which Blue Thumb released. Mason publicly denounced the release as a "bootleg".

Mason eventually signed a deal with Columbia Records who bought out his Blue Thumb contract.

Blue Thumb issued Dave Mason Is Alive in 1973 with remaining tracks from the Troubadour set.

== Track listing ==
All tracks composed by Dave Mason; except where indicated.

=== Side one ===
1. "To Be Free" - 3:19
2. "In My Mind" - 3:19
3. "Here We Go Again" - 1:56
4. "A Heartache, A Shadow, A Lifetime" - 3:35
5. "Headkeeper" - 4:39

=== Side two ===
1. "Pearly Queen" (Jim Capaldi, Steve Winwood) (Note: The album package credits "all songs" to Mason and fails to note this track as an exception.) - 3:32
2. "Just a Song" - 3:01
3. "World in Changes" - 4:47
4. "Can't Stop Worrying, Can't Stop Loving" - 3:04
5. "Feelin' Alright" - 5:40

== Personnel ==
- Dave Mason - electric and acoustic guitar, vocals
- Felix Falcon aka "Flaco" - conga and percussion
- "Dr." Rick Jaeger - drums
- Mark T. Jordan - piano and keyboard instruments
- Lonnie Turner - bass

Background vocals (Special thanks to):

- Rita Coolidge
- Spencer Davis
- Kathi McDonald
- Graham Nash

== Production ==
- Songs 1-5 were recorded at Sunset Sound Studios, Hollywood (Wayne Dailey, recordist)
- Songs 6-10 are excerpts from live performances at the Troubadour
- Recording and mixing engineer - Al Schmitt
- Remote equipment by Wally Heider and crew - Miles Weiner, Terry Stark, Chris Chigaridas
- Mastered by Bob MacLeod at Artisan Sound Recorders, Hollywood
- Photography by Bill Matthews
- Album design by Ruby Mazur's Art Department

== Chart positions ==
Year	Chart	Position
1972	The Billboard 200 Pop Albums	51

Headkeeper Track

Year	Chart	Position
1972	Billboard Top 50 AOL Rock Tracks	1
