= Certified Live =

Live album by Dave Mason
- Released: November 1976
- Genre: Rock
- Length: 76:00
- Label: Columbia
- Producer: Dave Mason

Dave Mason chronology
Split Coconut (1975)	Certified Live (1976)	Let It Flow (1977)

Professional ratings
Review scores
Source	Rating
Allmusic	2/5 stars
Encyclopedia of Popular Music	2/5 stars

Certified Live is a live album by Dave Mason, which was released as a double-LP in 1976. The album was recorded at the Universal Amphitheatre in Universal City, California

== Track listing ==
No.	Title	Writer(s)	Length
1.	"Feelin' Alright"	Dave Mason	6:21
2.	"Pearly Queen"	Steve Winwood, Jim Capaldi	3:41
3.	"Show Me Some Affection"	Mason	4:36
4.	"All Along the Watchtower"	Bob Dylan	4:46
5.	"Take It to the Limit"	Randy Meisner, Don Henley, Glenn Frey	3:34
6.	"Give Me a Reason Why"	Mason	4:12
7.	"Sad and Deep as You"	Mason	3:12
8.	"Every Woman"	Mason	2:36
9.	"World in Changes"	Mason	5:25
10.	"Goin' Down Slow"	St. Louis Jimmy Oden	6:43
11.	"Look at You, Look at Me"	Mason, Capaldi	12:50
12.	"Only You Know and I Know"	Mason	4:45
13.	"Bring It On Home to Me"	Sam Cooke	5:05
14.	"Gimme Some Lovin'"	Winwood, Spencer Davis, Muff Winwood	8:14

== Personnel ==
- Dave Mason – guitar, vocals
- Mike Finnigan – keyboards, vocals, lead vocal on "Goin' Down Slow"
- Dr. Rick Jaeger – drums
- Gerald Johnson – bass
- Jim Kruegar – guitar, vocals

== Production ==
- Executive producer – Michael Dilbeck
- Management – Jason Cooper
- Recording – Walley Heider Recording
- Engineers – Bruce Botnick, Doug Botnick
- Mixing – Ron Nevison
- Art direction – Ron Coro
- Album design – Tom Steele
- Photography – Jim Greene

== Releases ==
- CD Certified Live Blue Note 1992
- CD Certified Live One Way Records 1995
- CD Certified Live EMI Music Distribution / Sony Music Entertainment 2006
- CD Certified Live Sony Japan 2010
