= Jimmy Hotz =

American inventor, record producer, engineer, author and musician

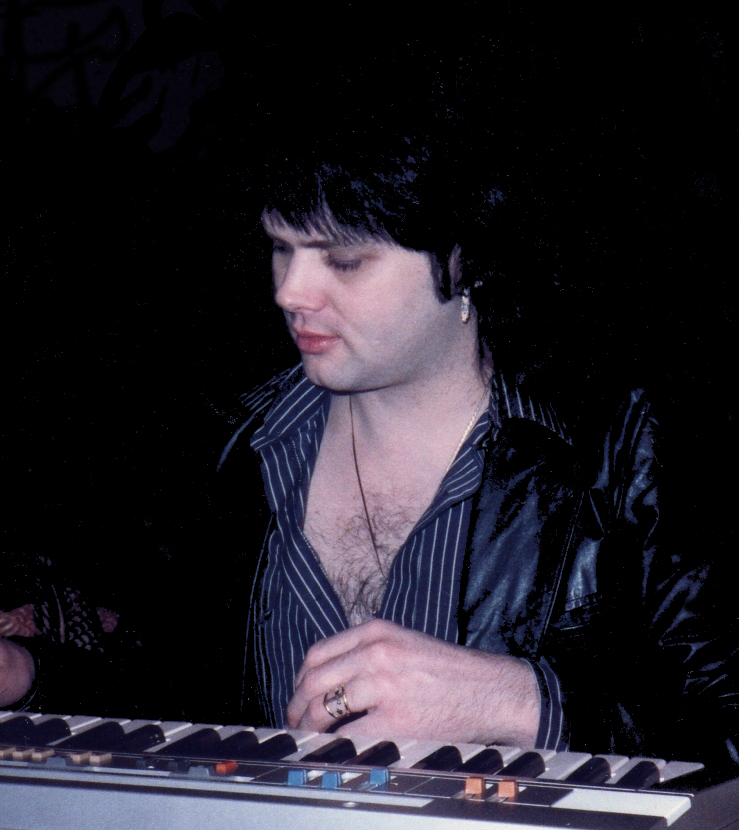

Background information
- Birth name: Jimmy Hotz
- Born: October 12, 1953 Sherman, Texas
- Died: June 5, 2023 (aged 69)
- Genres: Art rock; progressive rock; blues; rock; soul; funk; R&B; contemporary Christian music; gospel; hip hop
- Occupation(s): Producer, engineer, inventor, musician, recording engineer, programmer, author, consultant
- Instruments: Vocals; guitar; keyboards; bass guitar; the Hotz Box; the Hotz Translator; SpaceHarp; flute
- Years active: 1970–June 5, 2023
- Labels: MCA; Warner Bros.; Universal; Star Song; WEA; Cypress; Shady Records / Interscope Records; Griselda Records; Frontiers; Dossier; Vision
- Website: jimmyhotz.com

Jimmy Hotz (October 12, 1953 – June 5, 2023) was an American inventor, record producer, recording engineer, electronic music pioneer, audio expert, author and musician.

== Background ==
Hotz began playing guitar at the age of seven.

He played a number of instruments such as the guitar, keyboards, flute, drums and his own inventions such as the "Hotz Box" and the "Hotz MIDI Translator". Hotz has done a number of recordings where all of the instruments were played by him using only the Hotz Box as an input device.

In the music business Jimmy Hotz has worked with Fleetwood Mac, Dave Mason, NSYNC, Mobius 8 B. B. King, Yes, Jon Anderson, Haven and dozens of other recording artists as either a producer, engineer, mixer, studio musician, or musical instrument designer. Hotz was engineer and did programming on B. B. King's Grammy-nominated King of the Blues: 1989. Hotz was also the engineer on King's Grammy-nominated "Standing on the Edge of Love", for Best Contemporary Blues Recording in 1988 (from The Color of Money soundtrack).

You Rock Guitar featured a video of Jimmy playing their MIDI guitar through the Hotz Midi Translator software.

In 2011 he released his debut novel, The Gates of Time.

Hotz lived and worked in Southern California while developing his inventions.

== Inventions ==
He is noted for his pioneering work with electronic music synthesizer MIDI controller development / programming and as a technical consultant to Microsoft, Intel, Electronic Arts, Atari, JBL and other concerns for new product development.

He is the inventor of the "Hotz Box", Hotz "MIDI vest" and the "Atari Hotz Box", "Hotz MIDI Translator", computer software which has won interest and acclaim at the annual NAMM Show. Performers such as Mick Fleetwood, Jon Anderson, Paul Haslinger, Scott Gershin and others have been using Hotz products in their creative work.

He is the inventor of numerous electronic devices and software innovations and has received three US Patents in music technology.

As an expert in 3D computer graphics, Hotz was the chief visionary behind the 3dMAxMedia "Zuma Project", assembling the team which developed the technology to manipulate 3D imagery in real-time with audio, MIDI and other real-time control devices.

"Zuma" won a 2001 Innovation award from Computer Graphics World Magazine and was used on the 2001 NSYNC PopOdyssey tour.

== Patents ==
- US Patent No. 5,099,738: "MIDI Musical Translator"
- US Patent No. 5,502,274: "Electronic musical instrument for playing along with prerecorded music and method of operation."
- US Patent No. 5,619,003: "Electronic musical instrument dynamically responding to varying chord and scale input information."
- European Patent No. EP 0452347 B1: "Universal Electronic Musical Instrument Controller"

== Solo work ==
He recorded a solo album, Beyond the Crystal Sea, in the late 70s, which was released in 1980. It is listed as one of the Top 100 Christian Rock Albums of All Time, No. 98 and one of CCM's 500 Best Albums Of All Time No. 210. It is also considered one of, if not the best example of "Christian Art Rock" by critics and collectors.

His music project, The Gates of Time, was recorded using Hotz's invention, the Hotz Box along with the Hotz MIDI Translator software, which were the primary instruments.

== Discography ==
=== With various artists ===
Year	Artist	Recording	Type	Additional information
1976	Dove	"Beyond the Blues"	Single	–
1978	Silent Partner	"None the Wiser"	Single	–
1978	Chuck Sugar	Master Key	Album	–
1978	Various Artists	Dawntreader	Album	Star Song Communications release. Jimmy Hotz, ArkAngel, John Perez, Mark Christian and others.
1979	Randy Adams	Songs From Seven Years	Album	–
1980	Lb. Salt	"Didn't I"	Single	–
1980	Jimmy Hotz	Beyond the Crystal Sea	Album	Top 100 Christian Rock Albums of All Time No. 98, & CCM's 500 Best Albums Of All Time No. 210
1980	ArkAngel	Warrior	Album	Top 100 Christian Rock Albums of All Time No. 87, & CCM's 500 Best Albums Of All Time No. 106
1981	Speedy West Jr.	Used Guitars	Album	–
1981	Austin O'Neal	"Someone has to Lose"	Single	–
1981	Austin O'Neal	"Southern Louisiana Get Down"	Single	–
1981	Giant Killer	Valley of Decision	Album	CCM's 500 Best Albums of All Time No. 265
1981	Giant Killer	Whose Side You On ?	Album	-
1981	Ezy Prophet	"Burn it Down"	Single	–
1981	Ezy Prophet	"Keep on Tryin'"	Single	–
1981	Maya	Z-Rocks	Album	–
1981	Peristyle	"I'm Out of Lies"	Single	–
1981	Peristyle	"Childsplay"	Single	–
1982	Alan Spears	"Take This Heart"	Single	–
1982	Alan Spears	"Hard Times for Lovers"	Single	–
1983	Maya	Murder by Love	Album	–
1984	Joe Savage	"Out of Control"	Single	–
1984	Lee Marquette	"Tease Me"	Single	–
1984	Joe Savage and the Joe Savage Band	"Don't Let It Go"	Single	–
1984	Joe Savage and the Joe Savage Band	"Life"	Single	–
1984	Billy Lee Riley	"Rock 'n' Roll Money"	Single	–
1984	Billy Lee Riley	"Old time Rock 'n' Roll"	Single	–
1984	Terry Rose	"Southern Comfort"	Single	–
1984	Memphis	"Gone But Not Forgotten"	Single	–
1984	Gary McCrary	"Texas Tornado"	Single	–
1984	Gary McCrary	"Louisiana Purchase"	Single	–
1985	Palomino	"Twin Silver Running"	Single	–
1985	Palomino	"Photographic Memory"	Single	–
1985	Shock Therapy	Shock Therapy	Album	–
1986	B. B. King	"Standing on the Edge of Love"	Single	from The Color of Money soundtrack. 1988 Grammy Nomination for Best Contemporary Blues Recording
1987	Dave Mason	Two Hearts	Album	featuring Steve Winwood and Phoebe Snow
1987	Dave Mason and Phoebe Snow	"The Dreams I Dream"	Single	US AC No. 11 featuring Phoebe Snow
1987	Dave Mason	"Fighting for Love"	Single	-
1988	Dave Mason featuring Steve Winwood	"Something in the Heart"	Single	US Mainstream Rock No. 24 featuring Steve Winwood
1988	Gary Wright	Who I Am	Album	Pre-production
1988	B. B. King	King of the Blues: 1989	Album	Guest artists included Bonnie Raitt, Mick Fleetwood, Stevie Nicks, Steve Cropper, Tom Scott, Marty Grebb and Jerry Lynn Williams. 1990 Grammy Nomination for Best Contemporary Blues Recording.
1988	Dan Aykroyd and Kim Basinger	"Did You Ever Have The Feeling"	Single	from My Stepmother is an Alien soundtrack
1990	Haven	"Proud Soldiers"	Single	–
1990	Raymond Louis Kennedy	"Can You Tell Me Who the Heroes Are"	Single	–
1990	Raymond Louis Kennedy	"Sing for the Children"	Single	–
1990	Fleetwood Mac	Behind the Mask	Album	No. 18 US, No. 1 UK, Certifications Gold US, Platinum UK
1991	Haven	"Hold On"	Single	–
1991	Shock Therapy	Hate Is a 4-Letter Word	Album	–
1991	Terry Reid	Fifth of July "Cindy"	Vinyl, 12"	–
1995	Fleetwood Mac	Time	Album	No. 47 UK
1999	Dave Mason featuring Steve Winwood	Ultimate Collection	Album	–
2000	Haven	Haven	Album	–
2001	Haven	The Road	Album	–
2007	Jimmy Hotz	The Gates of Time	EP	–
2007	Jimmy Hotz	"Long Long Ago"	Single	–
2007	Jimmy Hotz	"The Gates of Time"	Single	–
2010	Haven	"Proud Soldiers"	Single	Video Version
2010	Haven	"All I Ever Need"	Single	Video Version
2010	Haven	"Celebrate"	Single	–
2010	Haven	"Superstar"	Single	–
2011	Haven	"Angels of the Earth"	Single	–
2012	Haven	"Proud Soldiers – Military Tribute"	Single	Military Tribute – Video Version
2017	David Gale	Corner Store	Album	Mastered by Jimmy Hotz
2019	Albiter Sound	Motor	Album	-
2019	Albiter Sound	"Hard Leave"	Single	-
2019	Wayne Jackson and The Memphis Horns Band	The Lost Nashville Sessions	Album	Engineering at the Grand Studio – Nashville, Tennessee 1985
2020	TEDDY G. Gatto	"Hope for the World"	Single	Co-Producer, Engineer, Mixer, Arranger, Musician
2020	TEDDY G. Gatto	"Born in America"	Single	Co-Producer, Engineer, Mixer, Arranger, Musician
2020	Mick Fleetwood	"These Strange Times"	Single	Additional Engineering
2022	TEDDY G. Gatto and Jimmy Hotz	"War"	Single	Co-Producer, Engineer, Mixer, Arranger, Musician
2022	Conway The Machine	"God Don't Make Mistakes"	Album	Co-Writer, Sampled Loop Creator. Billboard 200 No.175 US
2022	Conway The Machine	"So Much More"	Single	Co-Writer, Sampled Loop Creator.
