= It's Like You Never Left =

Studio album by Dave Mason
- Released: 29 October 1973
- Recorded: 1973
- Studios: CBS Studios, San Francisco; Record Plant, Los Angeles; Sunset Sound Recorders, Hollywood, CA
- Genre: Pop/rock
- Length: 34:40
- Label: Columbia / CBS
- Producer: Dave Mason

Dave Mason chronology
Dave Mason Is Alive (1972)	It's Like You Never Left (1973)	Dave Mason (1974)

Professional ratings
Review scores
Source	Rating
AllMusic	3/5 stars
Christgau's Record Guide	C
MusicHound Rock	2/5
The Rolling Stone Record Guide	3/5 stars

It's Like You Never Left is the third solo studio album by Dave Mason, released on 29 October 1973, on the CBS Records label (S65258) in the UK and by Columbia Records (PC 31721) in the US. It was reissued on CD in the US by One Way Records (A 26077) in July 1995 and Repertoire Records (RES 2320) in Europe in 2005.

== Track listing ==
All tracks are written by Dave Mason, except "Side Tracked", co-written by Rick Jaeger, Lonnie Turner and Mark Jordan.

Side A
No.	Title	Length
1.	"Baby... Please"	3:15
2.	"Every Woman"	1:40
3.	"If You've Got Love"	3:19
4.	"Maybe"	4:03
5.	"Headkeeper"	3:35

Side B
No.	Title	Length
6.	"Misty Morning Stranger"	4:30
7.	"Silent Partner"	3:03
8.	"Side Tracked"	3:30
9.	"The Lonely One"	4:42
10.	"It's Like You Never Left"	3:03
Total length:		34:40

== Personnel ==
- Dave Mason, Graham Nash (tracks: 1, 2, 5), John Batdorf (track: 6) - vocals
- Clydie King, Julia Tillman Waters, Kathleen Saroyan, Maxine Willard Waters (tracks: 3, 10) - backing vocals
- Dave Mason, George "Son Of Harry" Harrison (track: 3) - guitar
- Mark T. Jordan - piano (tracks: 3, 6, 9), organ (track: 9)
- Malcolm Cecil - Moog programming (track: 7)
- Dave Mason - Moog bass synthesizer (track: 7)
- Chuck Rainey (track: 1), Carl Radle (track: 3, 9), Charles Fletcher (track: 4), Greg Reeves (tracks: 5, 10), Lonnie Turner (track: 6) - bass guitar
- Jim Keltner (tracks: 3, 5, 9, 10), Rick Jaeger (tracks: 1, 6, 7) - drums
- Rocky Dzidzornu (tracks: 1, 7), Larry "Nastyee" Latimer (track: 10) - congas
- Denny Morouse, Norma Jean Bell, Steve Madaio (track: 6) - horns
- Stevie Wonder - harmonica (track: 9)

== Production ==
- Producer – Dave Mason
- Co-producer – Malcolm Cecil
- Arranged By – Dave Mason
- Recorded By – Al Schmitt, Glen Kolotkin, Malcolm Cecil
- Mixed By – Al Schmitt
