= Richard Campbell (American musician) =

American musician (born 1958)

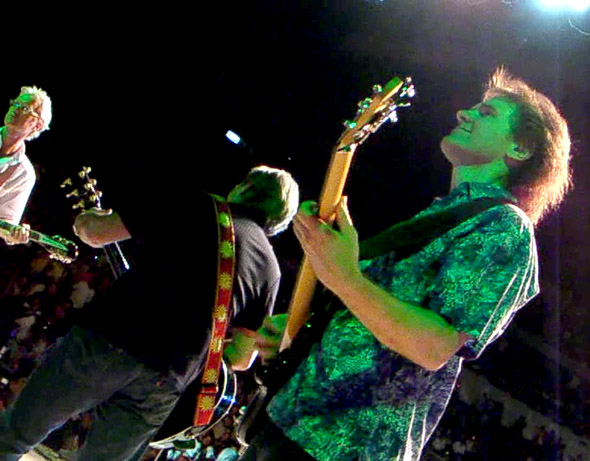
- Richard Campbell in Manila 2007

Background information
- Born: Richard J. Campbell; December 7, 1958 (age 67); Van Nuys, California, U.S.
- Genres: Rock; pop
- Occupations: Musician; singer-songwriter; record producer
- Instruments: Bass guitar; vocals
- Years active: 1980–present
- Label: Burgundy
- Website: accessbackstage.com

Richard J. Campbell (born December 7, 1958) is an American musician best known for his work as a bass guitarist and vocalist for Natalie Cole in the 1980s, and more recently with Three Dog Night, Dave Mason, and America.

Campbell was born in Van Nuys, California, and moved with his family to Paradise, California in 1966, where Campbell began playing piano age 7. He took up trumpet in grammar school, then switched to bass guitar in high school and began performing around northern California with his band "Music Company" which featured Scott Dugdale (original music composer for Astronomy: Observations and Theories) on drums and Steve Williams on keyboards. Later, Glynnis Talken, Campbell's future wife, joined the band for a television telethon performance for KHSL TV in Chico, California.

After two years studying music at California State University, Chico (CSU Chico) Campbell transferred to CSU Northridge to complete his studies and to be closer to the music industry.

== Career ==
Richard composed and recorded soundtracks for industrial and educational films for Coronet Films and worked as a tech in several recording studios in Los Angeles. In 1983, Campbell became musical director for CBS Records group "The Pinups" produced by Peter Hauke, co-managed by the Holland-Dozier-Holland Group, and featuring Glynnis Talken, whom he married in September of that year.

Campbell then began touring as bass guitarist and vocalist for Natalie Cole in the mid-1980s including an appearance at the Nelson Mandela 70th Birthday Tribute at Wembley Stadium, along with various television and live concert performances, until 1989, when Campbell was hired to tour with rock group Three Dog Night.

Campbell toured with Three Dog Night until 1996, with sporadic performances as bassist and vocalist for the Dave Mason Band and The Edgar Winter Group. After a seven-week stint as a tour manager for the Ringo Starr All Starr Band in 1997, Campbell joined up with Chuck Negron, former lead vocalist with Three Dog Night, and toured and recorded with Negron through the rest of the nineties. Campbell appears on the CD "Chuck Negron Live in Concert", holding down multiple job titles including bass guitar, vocalist and ProTools engineer.

In 2000 Campbell began touring full-time with The Dave Mason Band, contributing bass guitar, vocals, and tour management to the live album "Dave Mason: Live at Sunrise".

In 2003, Campbell was hired to fill the bass guitar and vocalist slot for folk rock group America. Campbell appears with America on the "America Live at the Sydney Opera House" DVD released by Roadshow Entertainment, America Live at the Ventura Theatre and PBS's Soundstage which aired in summer of 2005. Rich Campbell also appears on America's double CD set Here & Now (America album) release on Sony subsidiary Burgundy Records and debuting in the Billboard Top 200 Album chart at #52 in January 2007. Campbell contributed bass guitar, vocals, and art direction to America Live in Concert: Wildwood Springs, and makes a cameo appearance on Jeff Larson's CD "Heart of the Valley" in 2009.

In November 2014, Campbell performed with the band America on Infinity Hall Live Season 04, Episode 01, which first aired on PBS in June 2015. He is credited with vocals, bass, keyboards and tour management. Campbell also appears in America's Live at the London Palladium concert, released in 2019 on America Records.

Richard Campbell is a member of the American Federation of Musicians, SAG-AFTRA, and a voting member of NARAS, and currently lives in Los Angeles with his wife and two children.

== Film music composition ==
- The Plasma Membrane by Coronet (Firm); Bill Walker Productions. VHS video : NTSC color broadcast system, Language: English, Publisher: St. Louis, Mo. : Coronet/MTI Film & Video; [Rochester, N.Y.] : Dist. by Ward's Natural Science Establishment, Inc., 1988.
- Cell Biology : the Living Cell by Coronet/MTI Film and Video. VHS video:Partial animation, Language: English, Publisher: Columbus, OH : Coronet/MTI Film & Video, ©1988.
- Your Active Body : Bones and Movement by Mel Waskin; Ellen Bowen; Bob Gronowski; Matt Newman; Joel Marks; Bill Walker Productions.; Coronet (Firm); Coronet/MTI Film and Video.; VHS video : Partial animation : Elementary and junior high school, Language: English, Publisher: Northbrook, Ill. : Coronet/MTI Film and Video, ©1988.
- Light by Eric R Russell; Sabrina Plisco-Morris; Judy Berlin; Kenneth J Kligerman; Glynnis Campbell; Richard Campbell; Barr Films.; VHS video : Elementary and junior high school, Language: English, Publisher: Irwindale, CA : Barr Films, ©1986.
- Wonder World of Science by Bill Walker Productions.; Coronet/MTI Film and Video.; Animation of Arizona. Video : Partial animation : Primary school, Language: English, Publisher: Northbrook, IL : Coronet, 1989.
- Does It Ever Rain in the Desert? by Coronet (Firm); Bill Walker Productions.; Coronet/MTI Film and Video.; VHS video : Beta : Primary school : U-matic, Language: English, Publisher: Deerfield, IL : Coronet/MTI Film & Video, 1987.
- Global Winds by Mel Waskin; Coronet (Firm); Bill Walker Productions.; VHS video, Language: English, Publisher: Deerfield, Ill. : Coronet, 1985.
- What's the Brightest Star in the Sky? by Mel Waskin; Bill Walker Productions.; Coronet (Firm); Coronet/MTI Film and Video.; VHS video : Partial animation : Primary school, Language: English, Publisher: Northbrook, IL : Coronet/MTI Film & Video, ©1993.
- Atmospheric Science : The Earth, Atmospheric Science : The Earth's Atmosphere; Atmospheric Science : Winds and Air Currentsby Bill Walker Productions.; Coronet (Firm); BioMedia Associates.; Video : Partial animation : Preschool, Language: English, Publisher: Northbrook, IL : Coronet/MTI Film & Video, [1991]
- Where Do Lost Balloons Go? by Coronet (Firm); Bill Walker Productions.; Coronet/MTI Film and Video.; VHS video : Beta : Partial animation : Primary school : U-matic, Language: English, Publisher: Deerfield, IL : Coronet/MTI Film & Video, 1986.
- Why Doesn't Grass Grow On the Moon? by Bill Walker Productions.; Coronet/MTI Film and Video.; VHS video : Beta : Partial animation : Primary school : U-matic, Language: English, Publisher: Deerfield, IL : Coronet Film & Video, 1986.
