= Old Crest on a New Wave =

Studio album by Dave Mason
- Released: 1980
- Studio: Hollywood Sound (Hollywood, California).
- Genre: Rock
- Length: 35:15
- Label: Columbia
- Producer: Dave Mason; Joe Wissert

Dave Mason chronology
Mariposa de Oro (1978)	Old Crest on a New Wave (1980)	The Best of Dave Mason (1981)

Singles from Old Crest on a New Wave
- 1. "Save Me" Released: 1980

Old Crest on a New Wave is the eighth solo studio album by the English musician, singer-songwriter, and guitarist Dave Mason. The album includes background vocals by Michael Jackson on "Save Me", which peaked at No. 71 on the Billboard Hot 100 and at No. 70 on the Billboard R&B singles chart.

== Critical reception ==
The Globe and Mail wrote that "Mason has been retooling pretty much the same tunes and guitar riffs since his first solo album, Alone Together, came out a decade ago." The Boston Globe determined that "Mason's pleasant formula of middle of the road rockers, usually containing a stinging guitar break, hasn't changed since his landmark Alone Together solo debut 10 years ago."

== Track listing ==
All tracks are written by Dave Mason, unless otherwise noted.

No.	Title	Writer(s)	Length
1.	"Paralyzed"	Stephen Holsapple; Chuck Kavooras; Fred Marrone; Robert Marrone	3:37
2.	"You're a Friend of Mine"	Mark Stein	3:58
3.	"I'm Missing You"		3:10
4.	"Talk to Me"		4:44
5.	"Gotta Be on My Way"	Dave Mason; Mark Stein	3:48
6.	"Save Me" (duet with Michael Jackson)	Jim Krueger	3:38
7.	"Life is a Ladder"	Mark Stein	2:35
8.	"Tryin' to Get Back to You"		2:50
9.	"Get it Right"	Les Dudek	3:09
10.	"Old Crest on a New Wave"	Dave Mason; Mark Stein	3:46
Total length:			35:15

== Personnel ==
- Dave Mason – lead vocals, background vocals (except on "Save Me"), lead guitars
- Mark Stein – piano, organ, synthesizer, background vocals (except on "Save Me")
- Mike Finnigan – acoustic piano (3, 4), organ (8)
- Jim Krueger – rhythm guitar
- Bob Glaub – bass guitar
- Rick Jaeger – drums
- Ray Revis – percussion
- Michael Jackson – all background vocals on "Save Me"

Production

- Dave Mason – producer
- Joe Wissert – producer
- Ed Thacker – engineer
- Mike Reese – mastering at The Mastering Lab (Hollywood, California).
- Tony Lane – art direction, design
- Mara (Barry Gilbey and Sara Whittaker) – photography
