= Holiday Harmony =

Studio album by America
- Released: October 2002
- Recorded: 2002
- Genre: Soft rock
- Length: 45:57
- Label: Rhino
- Producer: Andrew Gold

America chronology
The Complete Greatest Hits (2001)	Holiday Harmony (2002)	The Grand Cayman Concert (2002)

2010 Edition
- Cover for the 2010 release

Professional ratings
Review scores
Source	Rating
Allmusic	1.5/5 stars

Holiday Harmony is the 15th studio album by American folk rock duo America, released by Rhino Records in 2002. Produced by Andrew Gold, it is a Christmas album. The album contains a number of traditional Christmas standards, some of which were recorded with distinct parallels to America's hits. For example, the "la-la-la" refrain in "Winter Wonderland" is strongly reminiscent of "A Horse With No Name", while "White Christmas" uses a guitar strumming style similar to that in "Tin Man". The album contains three new songs: "A Christmas to Remember", "Winter Holidays", and the "Ventura Highway"-themed "Christmas in California". "Winter Wonderland" became a minor hit during the Christmas season in 2002, reaching 26 on the Radio & Records Adult Contemporary chart.

In November 2010, the album was re-released on CD and digital download format as a "Collector's Edition". This edition contained a bonus track, "A Holly Jolly Christmas", produced by Bobby Woods.

== Track listing ==
No.	Title	Writer(s)	Length
1.	"Winter Wonderland"	Felix Bernard, Dick Smith	3:16
2.	"Let It Snow"	Sammy Cahn, Jule Styne	2:46
3.	"White Christmas"	Irving Berlin	3:55
4.	"A Christmas to Remember"	Gerry Beckley, Dewey Bunnell	3:56
5.	"Have Yourself a Merry Little Christmas"	Ralph Blane, Hugh Martin	3:44
6.	"Sleigh Ride"	Leroy Anderson, Mitchell Parish	4:03
7.	"Silver Bells"	Jay Livingston, Ray Evans	4:54
8.	"Christmas in California"	Bunnell, Andrew Gold	3:24
9.	"It's Beginning to Look a Lot Like Christmas"	Meredith Willson	2:39
10.	"Winter Holidays"	Beckley, Bunnell	3:43
11.	"Frosty the Snowman"	Steve Nelson, Jack Rollins	2:31
12.	"Silent Night"	Josef Mohr, Franz Gruber	4:38
13.	"The First Noel"	Traditional	2:28
14.	"A Holly Jolly Christmas" (2010 Collector's Edition bonus track)	Johnny Marks
