= Dave Mason (album) =

Studio album by Dave Mason
- Released: October 1974
- Studios: Sound Labs, Hollywood
- Genre: Rock
- Label: Columbia
- Producer: Dave Mason

Dave Mason chronology
It's Like You Never Left (1973)	Dave Mason (1974)	The Best Of Dave Mason (1974)

Dave Mason is the self-titled fourth solo studio album by Dave Mason and was released on the CBS Records label (a subsidiary of Columbia Records). It was reissued on CD on the One Way label in 1995. This album marked a major change in Mason's sound after his blues rock sound with his Blue Thumb Records releases, blending pop rock and yacht rock.

== Reception ==
Professional ratings
Review scores
Source	Rating
Allmusic	4.5/5 stars
Encyclopedia of Popular Music	3/5 stars

Allmusic gave a brief but positive retrospective review of the album, giving particular praise to the tracks "Show Me Some Affection," "Every Woman," and "All Along the Watchtower."

== Track listing ==
All tracks composed by Dave Mason; except where indicated

=== Side one ===
1. "Show Me Some Affection" - 4:14
2. "Get Ahold On Love" - 2:41
3. "Every Woman" - 2:58
4. "It Can't Make Any Difference To Me" (Lane Tietgen) - 2:15
5. "All Along the Watchtower" (Bob Dylan) - 4:03

=== Side two ===
1. "Bring It On Home to Me" (Sam Cooke) - 2:53
2. "Harmony and Melody" - 3:35
3. "Relation Ships" - 5:03
4. "You Can't Take It When You Go" - 4:08

== Personnel ==
The Dave Mason Band

- Dave Mason - guitar, lead vocals
- Mike Finnigan - keyboards, vocals
- Bob Glaub - bass
- Rick Jaeger - drums
- Jim Krueger - guitar (lead solo on tracks 4,6,7), vocals

Additional musicians

- Richard Bennett - pedal steel guitar
- Gary Barone, Jerry Jumonville, Jock Ellis, Sal Marquez - horn section
- Tim Weisberg - flute

Production

- Horns arranged by Dave Mason and Mike Finnigan
- Strings written and arranged by Nick DeCaro
- Harry Bluestone - concertmaster
- Recording and Mixing Engineer : Al Schmitt
- Assistant Engineer : Linda Tyler

== Chart positions ==
Year	Chart	Position
1974	Billboard Pop Albums	25
