= Edison Electric Band =

Edison Electric Band was an American rock band of the 1970s. It was led by Mark T. Jordan and featured bass player Freebo, who later played for Bonnie Raitt's band. It released an album for Cotillion in 1970, "Bless You, Dr. Woodward". Jordan was writer for Raitt's 1977 single "Two Lives".

== "Bless You, Dr. Woodward", Cotillion, 1970 ==
Track listing
Side one

1. "Ship Of The Future" — (Mark T. Jordan, David "Rip" Stock) — 2:37
2. "Over The Hill" — (Jordan, Joshua Rice) — 6:51
3. "Please Send Me" — (Percy Mayfield) — 4:35
4. "Baby Leroy" — (Rice) — 3:44

Side Two

5. "Rotal Fool" — (Jordan, Rice) — 3:21
6. "West Wind" — (Jordan, Rice) — 3:15
7. "Lonely Avenue" — (Doc Pomus) — 3:40
8. "Island Sun" — (Jordan, Rice) — 3:29
9. "Smokehouse" — (Stock) — 3:58
10. "Lebanese Packhorse" — (T.J. Tindall) — 0:40

Personnel
Edison Electric Band

- T.J. Tindall — guitars, vocals
- Mark T. Jordan — piano, electric piano, Hammond organ, guitars
- Dan Friedberg — bass, acoustic guitar
- David "Rip" Stock — drums, vocals, percussion

Additional Personnel

- Norman Pride — congas (tracks 1, 8)
- Michael Ziegler — guitars (tracks 9, 10)
- The Brookmead Mumble Choir — vocals (track 9)
