= Dave Mason =

English musician (1946–2026)

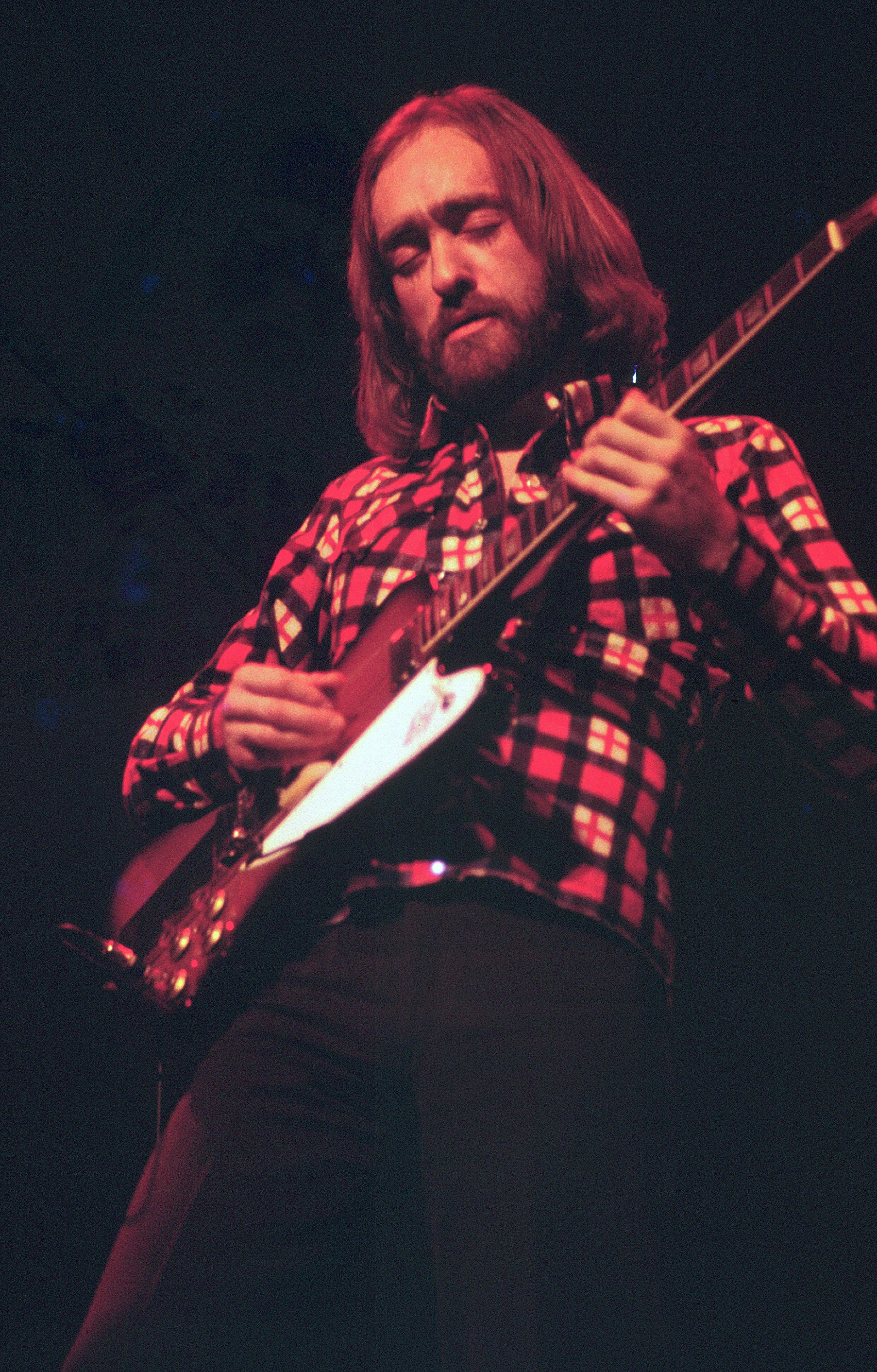
- Mason performing in 1974

Background information
- Born: David Thomas Mason; 10 May 1946; Worcester, England
- Died: 19 April 2026 (aged 79) Gardnerville, Nevada, U.S.
- Genres: Rock; pop rock; progressive rock; soft rock
- Occupations: Musician; singer; songwriter
- Instruments: Guitar; vocals; bass; sitar
- Years active: 1960–2026
- Labels: Blue Thumb; Harvest; Columbia; MCA; Atlantic
- Formerly of: The Jaguars; The Hellions; Julien Covey and the Machine; Traffic; Mason, Capaldi, Wood & Frog; Delaney & Bonnie and Friends; Derek and the Dominos; Fleetwood Mac; Ringo Starr & His All-Starr Band; Dave Mason and the Quarantines; Mark Knopfler's Guitar Heroes
- Website: davemasonmusic.com

David Thomas Mason (10 May 1946 – 19 April 2026) was an English musician who came to prominence in 1967 as a founding member of the rock band Traffic. He wrote and sang lead vocals on two of the band's best known songs, "Hole in My Shoe" and "Feelin' Alright?" His song "Only You Know and I Know" became a signature song for Delaney & Bonnie, and his 1977 solo hit, "We Just Disagree", has become a staple of U.S. classic hits and adult contemporary radio playlists.

After leaving Traffic, he pursued a solo career and recorded with artists that included Jimi Hendrix, George Harrison, Eric Clapton, Paul McCartney and Wings, the Rolling Stones, Michael Jackson, David Crosby, Graham Nash, Steve Winwood, Fleetwood Mac, Delaney & Bonnie, Leon Russell, and Cass Elliot.

In 2004, Mason started an electric guitar company with business partner and industrial designer Ravi Sawhney. That same year he was inducted into the Rock and Roll Hall of Fame as a member of Traffic.

== Early life ==
Mason was born in Worcester, England, on 10 May 1946, the youngest of two children of Edward Mason and Nora Wilson, who ran a sweet shop. He attended Christopher Whithead Boys' School, in the St.John's area of the city. He became infatuated with the electric guitar at an early age, becoming an avid follower of Hank Marvin, Buddy Guy and Elmore James. In his teens, he formed his own band, the Jaguars, which, with funding from his parents, recorded the 1963 single "Opus to Spring".

== Career ==
=== The Hellions ===
In 1964, Mason joined another Worcester band, the Hellions, which included drummer Jim Capaldi. In August of that year, the band was hired to back singer Tanya Day at the Star-Club in Hamburg, where they stayed at the same hotel as the Spencer Davis Group. Mason and Capaldi struck up a friendship with the Spencer Davis Group's keyboardist Steve Winwood. When the Hellions returned to England, they were a polished act and were in great demand, on their own and as a backing band for such singers as Adam Faith and Dave Berry. By the end of 1964, they had become the house band at London's Whisky-A-Go-Go Club.

They were quickly spotted by producer Kim Fowley and songwriter Jackie DeShannon, who offered them a song and helped arrange a recording contract with Piccadilly Records. In 1965, they released the DeShannon song "Daydreaming Of You" which Fowley produced, and the first song Mason ever wrote with Capaldi, "Shades of Blue". Neither song was a success but the band went on a UK tour with P. J. Proby. Another song, "Hallelujah", was released but it too failed to chart. In 1966, the band returned to Worcester. Mason made ends meet by playing with local groups, and by working as a roadie for the Spencer Davis Group. Capaldi pulled together a band called Deep Feeling, which recorded 12 songs, none of which were released at the time. Sunbeam Records released the set in 2008 as the album Pretty Colours.

=== Traffic ===
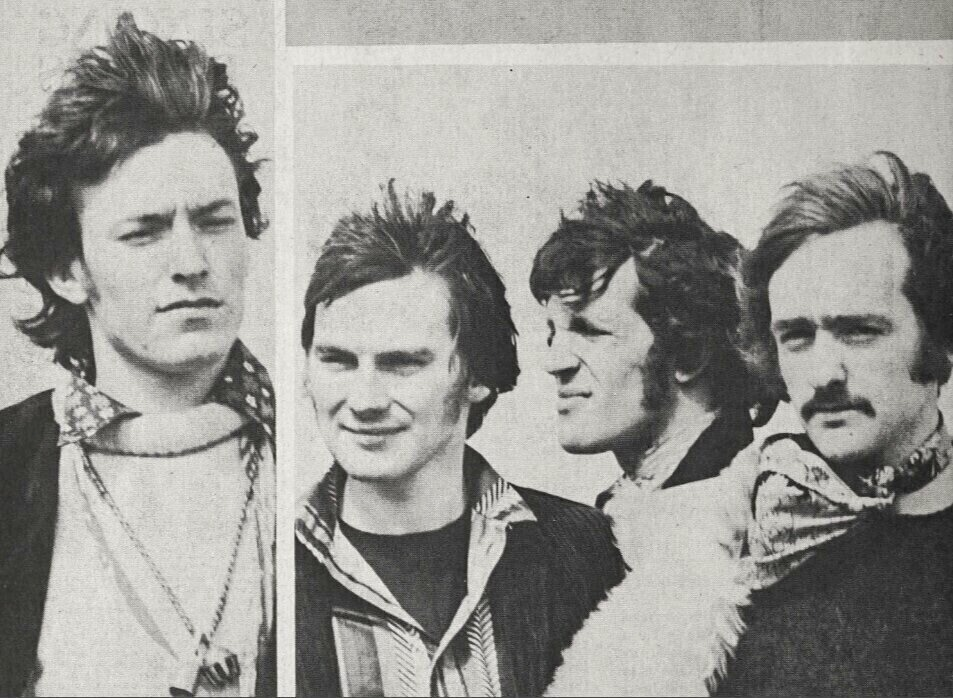
Mason (far right) with Traffic c. late 1967

In 1967, the Spencer Davis Group broke up and, with Winwood available, Capaldi gathered a new group, Traffic, which consisted of himself, Winwood, Mason and Chris Wood. They began jamming in Birmingham, then moved into a house in Berkshire. They began recording and produced a top-five hit, "Paper Sun". Their next song, the first that Mason wrote alone, was "Hole In My Shoe", which, with Mason's liberal use of the sitar, became one of the most successful and memorable songs of British psychedelia. It reached No. 3 on the UK charts and established Mason as a songwriter and singer. Traffic's first album, Mr. Fantasy, released in late 1967, was a huge success but Mason left the band soon after and moved to the United States. In early 1968 he released a solo single, "Just For You," with other Traffic members backing him.

The group invited him back when they began recording their next album, a self-titled effort, in the spring of 1968. According to some sources, he was fired only six months later, just after its release. Traffic then broke up. The group's 1969 compilation album, Last Exit, includes Mason's solo single "Just for You." Traffic would go on to re-form without Mason, although he did join them on the live album Welcome to the Canteen during the band's 1971 summer tour. In his time with the group, Mason usually wrote alone. Steve Winwood later recalled, "We all tended to write together, but Mason would come in with a complete song that he was going to sing and tell us all what he expected us to play. No discussion, like we were his backing group."

For the album Traffic, Mason wrote the song "Feelin' Alright?" which was released in September 1968 as the album's only single, but failed to chart. In 1969, the song was covered by Joe Cocker for his album With a Little Help from My Friends. Mason subsequently incorporated elements of the arrangement from Cocker's version into his own live performances of the song.

=== Session work ===
Mason did some session work on Jimi Hendrix's Electric Ladyland (September 1968), playing 12-string acoustic guitar on "All Along the Watchtower". He played the shehnai and bass drum on "Street Fighting Man" on the Rolling Stones' 1968 album Beggars Banquet. Mason appears on George Harrison's 1970 solo set All Things Must Pass. Also in 1970, he played on early studio sessions for Derek and the Dominos, including the Phil Spector production of "Tell the Truth", which was released on Eric Clapton's 1988 box set Crossroads. For Capaldi's 1971 album Oh How We Danced, he co-wrote "Big Thirst" and played harmonica on that track, plus the guitar solo on "Don't Be a Hero".

=== Delaney and Bonnie ===
In 1969, then settled in Los Angeles, Mason released the single "Just for You". On the B-side, he was backed by the band Family on "Little Woman", following his production of Family's first album in 1968, Music in a Doll's House, which included the original Mason song "Never Like This". He also played lead guitar with a rock and soul ensemble fronted by Delaney and Bonnie. In the meantime, Steve Winwood had founded Blind Faith with Eric Clapton. Delaney & Bonnie and Friends would go on to tour with Blind Faith as their opening act.

Mason recorded his debut solo album, Alone Together, in 1970. It included the track "Look at You, Look at Me" and the hit tune "Only You Know and I Know", which reached No. 42 on the Billboard chart. When Delaney and Bonnie recorded it the following year, the song charted even higher, reaching No. 20.

=== Cass Elliot ===
Also in 1970, Mason and Cass Elliot co-produced and recorded the album Dave Mason & Cass Elliot. Mason wrote five of the songs and co-wrote two with Elliot. Two singles were released: "Something to Make You Happy" and "Too Much Truth, Too Much Love". The duo appeared on The Tonight Show and The Andy Williams Show, and performed two concerts, at the Santa Monica Civic Auditorium and New York’s Fillmore East. The album peaked at No. 49 on the Billboard Top LPs chart in 1971.

=== Solo projects ===
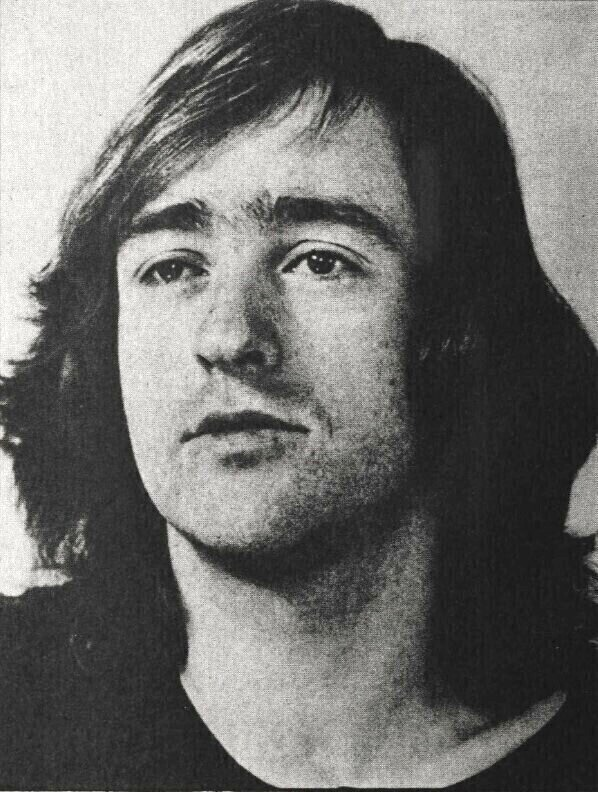
Mason in 1970

In the mid-to-late 1970s, Mason toured and recorded with guitarist Jim Krueger, keyboardist Mike Finnigan, bassist Gerald Johnson and drummer Rick Jaeger. Mason followed up with the album, Let It Flow, released in April 1977. The album peaked at No. 37 but spent 49 weeks on the charts, and went platinum largely as a result of the success of the album single "We Just Disagree", which was written by Krueger. The single reached No. 12, and other album singles "So High (Rock Me Baby and Roll Me Away)" and "Let It Go, Let It Flow" also charted in the U.S.

Mason's next album, Mariposa de Oro, was released the following year. It featured then little-known Jerry Lynn Williams as Mason's chief songwriting collaborator. The album also contained a cover of "Will You Still Love Me Tomorrow", which became a Top 40 single. The album itself reached No. 41 and would go on to achieve gold record certification.

Mason played himself in the film Skatetown, U.S.A., the following year, performing two songs in a roller disco as well as writing and performing the film's theme song.

In 1980, he released Old Crest on a New Wave. The album reached No. 74, but had one single that briefly charted titled "Save Me." The failure of this album resulted in Mason leaving the label Columbia. Later that year, he appeared alongside the singer Bonnie Pointer as a co-presenter on the American Music Awards.

Mason struggled to attract another major label but continued to tour during the 1980s, often as an acoustic tandem with Jim Krueger. In 1987, he released two albums, Some Assembly Required, on the Canadian label Maze Records, and Two Hearts on MCA Records. The latter album featured the single "Dreams I Dream," a duet with Phoebe Snow that reached No. 11 on the adult contemporary charts.

=== Fleetwood Mac ===
In 1993, Mason joined Fleetwood Mac. He toured with the group over the course of 1994–95 while sharing the bill with Crosby, Stills & Nash, REO Speedwagon and Pat Benatar. This extended tour featured many of the band's well-known 1970s songs but also incorporated tunes from Mason's time with Traffic, including "Dear Mr. Fantasy" and "Feelin' Alright?". Mason and vocalist Bekka Bramlett also performed a duet on "Only You Know and I Know", a song released by her parents, Delaney & Bonnie, when she was but two years old. The group would release the album Time late in 1995 before disbanding at the end of that year.

== Later years ==
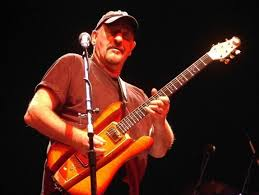
Mason performing at the Canyon Club in Agoura Hills in 2007

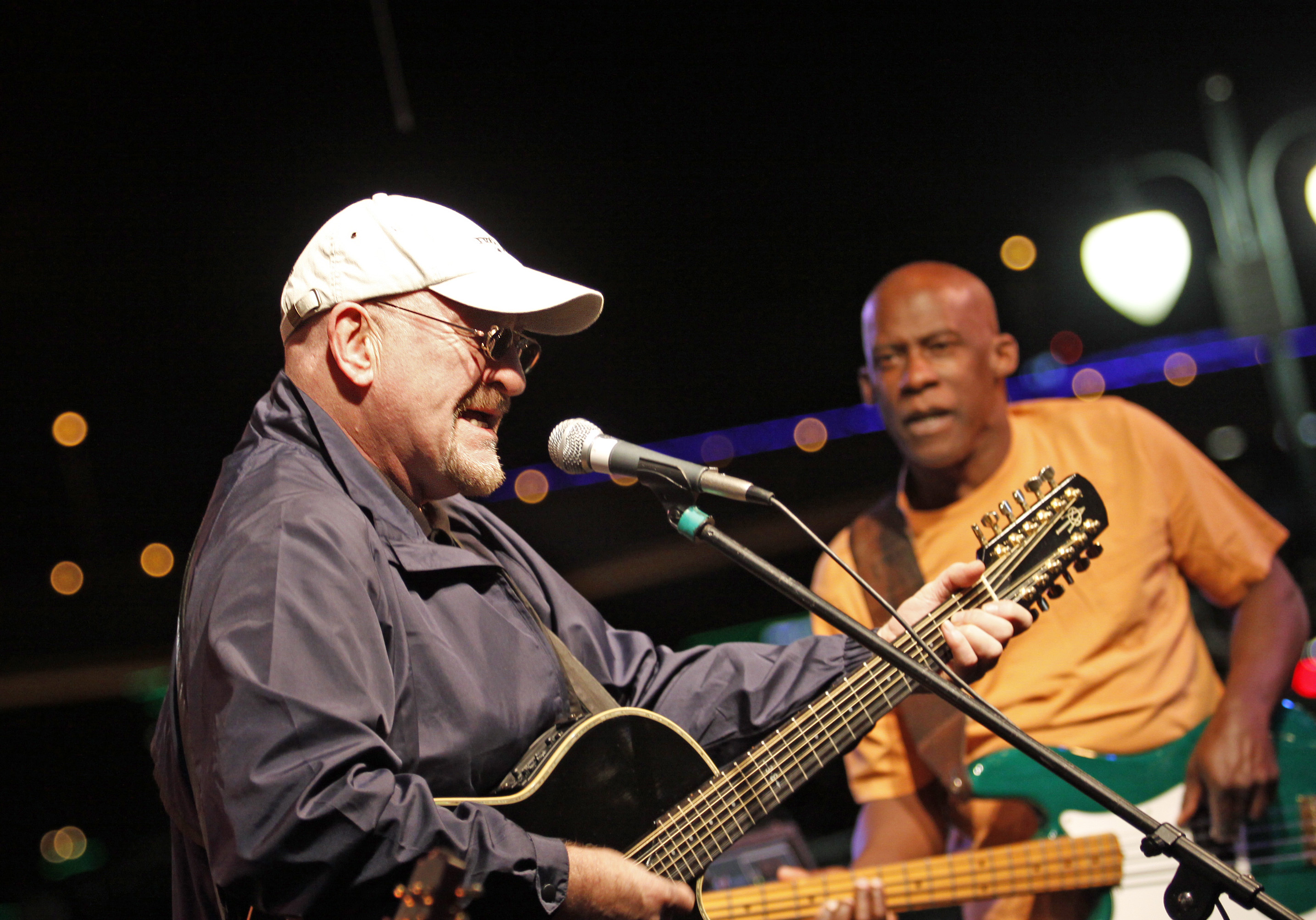
Mason performing with Gerald Johnson in Jacksonville in 2008

In 1997, Mason was scheduled to be a member of Ringo Starr & His All-Starr Band, performing "Only You Know and I Know," "We Just Disagree" and "Feelin' Alright," but was dropped from rehearsals before the tour started.

The following year he reunited with former Traffic bandmate Jim Capaldi for The 40,000 Headmen Tour, with a live album following the tour. In 2002, he released the DVD Dave Mason: Live at Sunrise, a recording of a live performance at the Sunrise Musical Theater in Sunrise, Florida, backed by Bobby Scumaci on keyboards, Johnne Sambataro on rhythm guitar (who rejoined Mason for the DVD, after previously touring with him in 1978), Richard Campbell on bass, and Greg Babcock on drums.

=== RKS Guitars ===
In 2004, Mason co-founded RKS Guitars with industrial designer Ravi Sawhney. Their partnership aimed to reinvent the electric guitar through sustainable materials and modular design. The RKS system featured a neck-through-body core, interchangeable body shells, and structural ribs made from aluminum or wood. A notable innovation was the use of Tenite, a cellulose-based plastic derived from farmed cottonwood trees and wood by-products, making it one of the earliest sustainable electric guitars.

The design garnered industry acclaim, earning two Silver IDEA Awards from the Industrial Designers Society of America, and was featured in publications including BusinessWeek. The project was also the subject of a case study by the Harvard Business Review.

RKS guitars were played by a range of acclaimed musicians, including Keith Richards, Mick Jagger, Ronnie Wood, Don Felder, and Rick Springfield. For their contributions to industrial design and innovation in music, both Mason and Sawhney were awarded honorary doctorates from the Academy of Art University.

=== Final projects ===
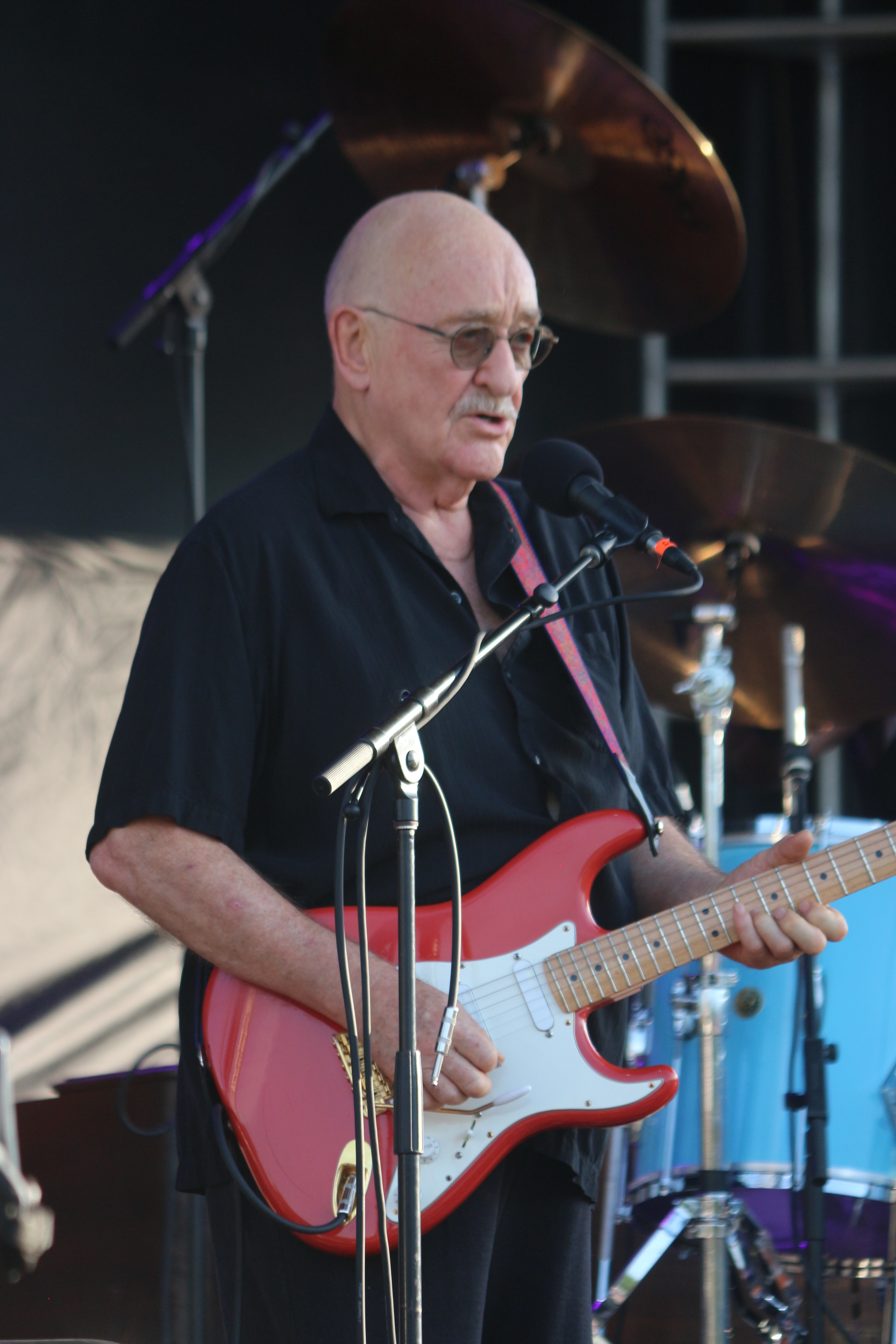
Mason performing in 2022

In 2008, Mason released his first studio album in more than 20 years, titled 26 Letters 12 Notes. He followed up with another album in 2014 called Future's Past.

Mason continued to perform regularly in the U.S., including a 2018 tour with Steve Cropper.

He released his final album, A Shade of Blues, in 2023. Featured on it are his re-imaginings of the Traffic standards “The Low Spark of High Heeled Boys” and “Dear Mr. Fantasy", with guitarist Joe Bonamassa adding distinctive riffs to both tracks.

=== Health problems and retirement from touring ===
In 2024, Mason announced the cancellation of all of his 2025 tour dates due to "ongoing health challenges". Though he originally planned to reschedule these dates, he stated in September 2025 that he had scrapped them, and subsequently announced his retirement from touring. He further clarified in his statement that he was not retiring from music altogether and intended to continue releasing new material.

== Personal life and death ==
Mason lived in Southern California from 1969, and in 2017, he owned homes in Carson City, Nevada, and Hawaii. As a result of living in America for the majority of his life, he spoke with an American accent in his later years.

Mason died in his sleep at his home in Gardnerville, Nevada, on 19 April 2026, at the age of 79. He was pre-deceased by one son, who died in 2006. He was survived by his fourth wife, Winifred Wilson (married 2018, no relation to his mother Nora Wilson), and one daughter.

== Philanthropy ==
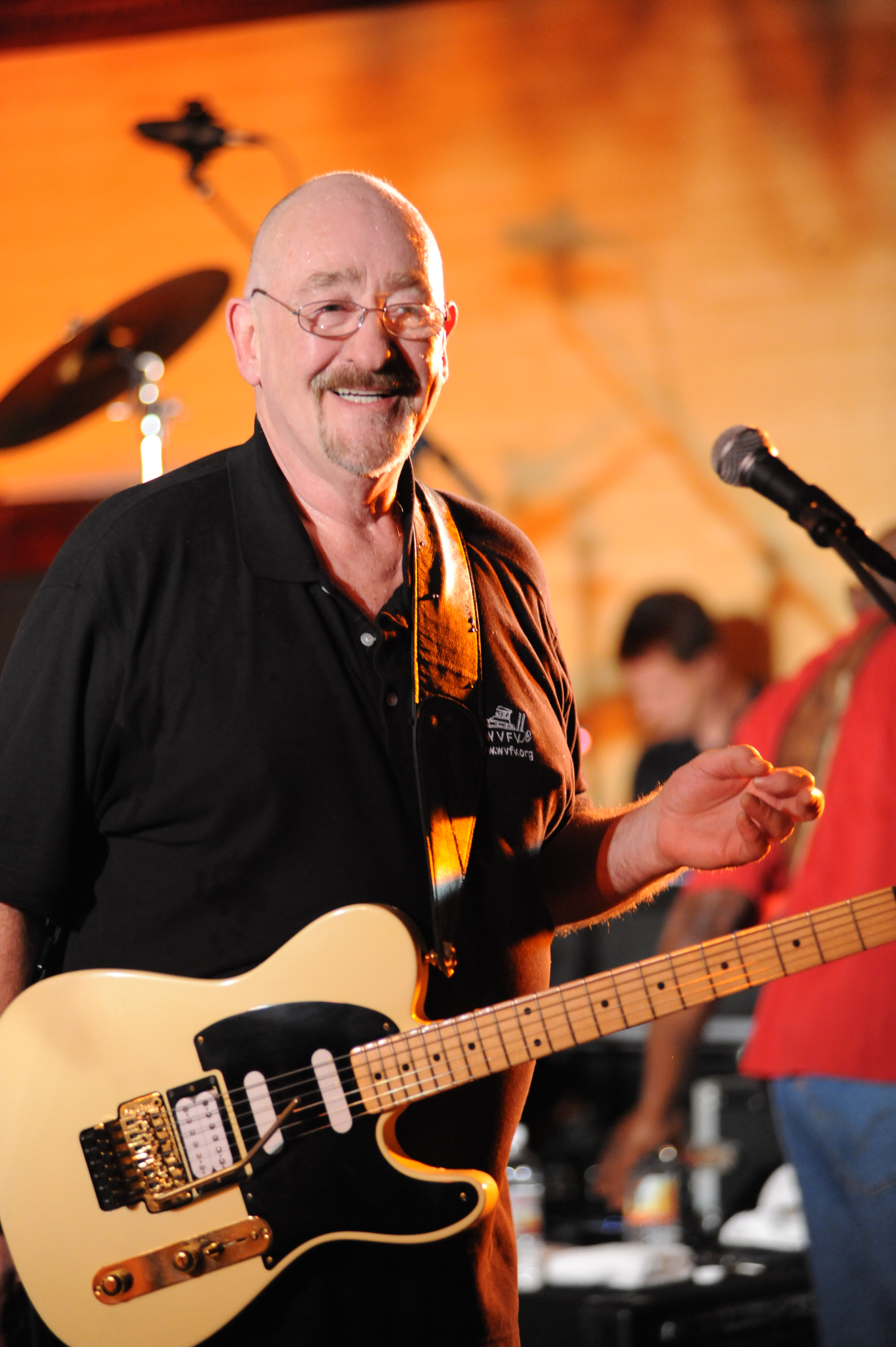
Mason in 2010

Mason was a proponent of music education for children. In 2005, he became an official supporter of Music Will (formerly Little Kids Rock), a non-profit organisation that provides free musical instruments and lessons to children in U.S. public schools. He was an honorary member of the organisation's board of directors.

Mason and his longtime friend Ted Knapp founded Rock Our Vets, an all-volunteer 501(c)3 charity supported by many other musicians, helping military veterans and the families of law enforcement and firefighters who lost their lives in the line of duty. The charity has focused on providing food and clothing to homeless veterans, laptop computers for veterans aspiring to continue their education, as well as suicide prevention.

== Discography ==
=== Studio albums ===
Solo studio albums
Year	Album	US	CAN	Certification	Label
1970	Alone Together	22	24	US: Gold	Blue Thumb Records
1971	Dave Mason & Cass Elliot	49	—		Blue Thumb Records
1972	Headkeeper	50	—		Blue Thumb Records
1973	It's Like You Never Left	25	—		Columbia Records
1974	Dave Mason	27	31	US: Gold	Columbia Records
1975	Split Coconut	37	85		Columbia Records
1977	Let It Flow	41	36	US: Platinum	Columbia Records
1978	Mariposa de Oro	74	46	US: Gold	Columbia Records
1980	Old Crest on a New Wave	74	—		Columbia Records
1987	Some Assembly Required	—	—		Chumley/Maze Records
1987	Two Hearts	—	—		MCA Records
2008	26 Letters – 12 Notes	—	—		Out The Box/Sony
2014	Future's Past	—	—		Something-Music
2017	Pink Lipstick (EP)	—	—		Barham Productions
2020	Alone Together, Again	—	—		Barham Productions
2023	A Shade Of Blues	—	—		Barham Productions

=== Live albums ===
- 1973: Dave Mason Is Alive (ABC/Blue Thumb/MCA) (recorded at the Troubadour, West Hollywood, CA, 1971) – US No. 116
- 1976: Certified Live (Columbia) (recorded on tour, 1975) – US No. 78
- 1999: Live: The 40,000 Headmen Tour (with Jim Capaldi) (Receiver Records) (recorded at various locations, Feb-April 1998)
- 2002: Live at Perkins Palace (Pioneer) (recorded 1981)
- 2002: Dave Mason: Live at Sunrise (Image Entertainment)
- 2004: XM Radio (Barham Productions) (recorded May 2003)
  - Reissued with bonus tracks in 2007 as Dave Mason Live at XM Satellite Radio (Friday Music)
- 2015: Traffic Jam (Barham Productions)

=== Compilation albums ===
- 1972: Scrapbook (Island) the only album that includes "Just for You" and "Little Woman"
- 1974: The Best of Dave Mason (Blue Thumb) – US No. 183
- 1974: Dave Mason at His Best (ABC/Blue Thumb) – US No. 133
- 1978: Very Best of Dave Mason (ABC/Blue Thumb) – US No. 179
- 1978: Skatetown, U.S.A. (Columbia)
  - soundtrack to the motion picture of the same name; Mason performs "Main Theme", "I Fell in Love", and "Feelin' Alright"
- 1978: California Jam II (Columbia)
  - recorded live at the music festival of the same name; Mason performs "Let it Go, Let it Flow" and "We Just Disagree"
- 1981: The Best of Dave Mason (Columbia)
- 1995: Long Lost Friend: The Best of Dave Mason (Columbia/Legacy)
- 1999: The Ultimate Collection (Hip-O)
- 2000: Super Hits (Sony Legacy)
- 2007: The Definitive Collection (Hip-O)
- 2014: The Columbia Years: The Definitive Anthology (Real Gone Music)

=== Singles ===
- 1963: "Opus To Spring", Independent
- 1968: "Just for You" b/w "Little Woman", Island Records (UK only)
- 1969: "Waitin' on You", Independent
- 1970: "World in Changes", Irving Music
- 1970: "Only You Know and I Know", Blue Thumb Records – US No. 42
- 1970: "Satin Red and Black Velvet Woman", Blue Thumb Records – US No. 97 (45 single, released on The Ultimate Collection in 1999)
- 1970: "Shouldn't Have Took More Than You Gave", Blue Thumb Records
- 1971: "Something To Make You Happy" b/w "Next To You", Dunhill Records, with Cass Elliot
- 1971: "A Heartache, A Shadow, A Lifetime (I'll Be Home)"
- 1972: "To Be Free" – US No. 121
- 1973: "Baby...Please"
- 1975: "Show Me Some Affection"
- 1977: "So High (Rock Me Baby and Roll Me Away)" — US Billboard No. 89, Cash Box No. 69
- 1977: "We Just Disagree" – US No. 12, US AC No. 19
- 1978: "Let It Go, Let It Flow" – US No. 45
- 1978: "Will You Still Love Me Tomorrow" – US No. 39
- 1978: "Mystic Traveller"
- 1978: "Don't It Make You Wonder"
- 1980: "Save Me" (with Michael Jackson) – US No. 71
- 1983: "Break Away"
- 1987: "Something In The Heart" – US Mainstream Rock No. 24
- 1988: "Dreams I Dream" (duet with Phoebe Snow) – US AC No. 11
- 1988: "Two Hearts"
- 2016: "It's Not Fair"
- 2016: "Whatever"
- 2019: "Jezebel" (featuring Midnight Blues Revue)
- 2020: "Feelin' Alright" (featuring The Quarantines)
- 2023: "Dear Mr. Fantasy" (featuring Joe Bonamassa)

=== Videos ===
- 1981: Live at Perkins Palace (Pioneer, laser disc)
- 1992: Best Live 1991 Tokyo (Bandai, laser disc)
- 2002: Live at Sunrise (Image Entertainment, DVD)
- 2008: The Legendary Guitar of Dave Mason (Hot Licks, instructional DVD)

=== Traffic ===
- 1967: Mr. Fantasy (UK: Island UK; United Artists US, released as Heaven is in Your Mind)
- 1968: Traffic (Island UK; United Artists US)
- 1969: Last Exit two tracks on Side 1; (Island UK; United Artists US)
- 1971: Welcome to the Canteen (live album) (Island UK; United Artists US)

=== Fleetwood Mac ===
- 1995: Time (Warner Bros. Records)

=== Session work ===
- 1966–1967: The Spencer Davis Group, singles (United Artists US; Fontana UK)
  - backing vocals on "Somebody Help Me", "Gimme Some Lovin'", and "I'm a Man"
- 1967: Julian Covey & The Machine, "A Little Bit Hurt" / "Sweet Bacon" single (Philips)
  - guitar and vocals
- 1968: Family, Music in a Doll's House (Reprise)
  - producer, songwriter of "Never Like This"
- 1968: The Jimi Hendrix Experience, Electric Ladyland (Reprise)
  - acoustic guitar on "All Along the Watchtower", backing vocals on "Crosstown Traffic"
- 1968: The Rolling Stones, Beggar's Banquet (Decca)
  - shehnai and bass drum on "Street Fighting Man"
- 1968: The Scaffold, The Scaffold: Live at the Queen Elizabeth Hall (Parlaphone)
  - guitar and sitar on "Thank U Very Much" and "2Days Monday"
- 1969: Gordon Jackson, Thinking Back (Marmalade)
  - producer, bass guitar, electric guitar, and slide guitar
- 1969: Merryweather, Word of Mouth (Capitol)
  - songwriter, guitar, bass, and vocals
- 1970: Delaney & Bonnie & Friends with Eric Clapton, On Tour (Atco)
  - guitar
- 1970: George Harrison, All Things Must Pass (Apple)
  - guitar on various tracks
- 1970: Bobby Lester, Bobby Lester (Columbia)
  - guitar on "Freedom"
- 1971: Delaney & Bonnie & Friends, Motel Shot (Atco)
  - guitar and vocals
- 1971: Graham Nash, Songs for Beginners (Atlantic)
  - electric guitar on "Military Madness"
- 1972: Jim Capaldi, Oh How We Danced (Island)
  - harmonica on "Big Thirst", guitar on "Don't Be a Hero"
- 1972: Crosby and Nash, Graham Nash / David Crosby (Atlantic)
  - lead guitar on "Immigration Man"
- 1972: Bobby Keys, Bobby Keys (Warner Bros.)
  - songwriter on "Steal from a King" and "Crispy Duck"
- 1973: David Blue, Nice Baby and the Angel (Asylum)
  - acoustic guitar, electric guitar, and vocals on "Outlaw Man"
- 1974: Graham Nash, Wild Tales (Atlantic)
  - 12-string guitar on "Oh! Camil (The Winter Soldier)"
- 1974: Phoebe Snow, Phoebe Snow (Shelter)
  - electric guitar on "No Show Tonight"
- 1975: Wings, Venus and Mars (Capitol)
  - electric guitar on "Listen to What the Man Said"
- 1978: Mike Finnigan, Black and White (Columbia)
  - lead guitar on "Hideaway From Love"
- 1978: Stephen Stills, Thoroughfare Gap (Columbia)
  - vocals on "You Can't Dance Alone", "We Will Go On", "What's the Game", and "Midnight Rider"
- 1979: Ron Wood, Gimme Some Neck (Columbia)
  - acoustic guitar on "F.U.C. Her"
- 1983: Donovan, Lady of the Stars (RCA)
  - guitar on "Boy for Every Girl"
- 1983: Don Felder, Airborn (Asylum)
  - vocals on "Never Surrender"
- 1988: Eric Clapton, Crossroads (Polydor)
  - guitar on "Ain't That Loving You", originally recorded ca. 1974
- 2004: Noel Redding, The Experience Sessions (Sony/BMG)
  - sitar on "There Ain't Nothing Wrong", originally recorded ca. 1968
- 2010: Jimi Hendrix, West Coast Seattle Boy (Legacy)
  - sitar on "Little One", originally recorded ca. 1968
- 2011: Derek and the Dominos, Layla and Other Assorted Love Songs: 40th Anniversary Edition (Universal)
  - guitar and vocals on "Roll It Over", guitar on "Tell the Truth" (Single Version) (both originally recorded June 1970)
