= List of Lost Girl characters =

The following is a listing of fictional characters from Lost Girl, the Canadian supernatural drama television series that premiered on Showcase on September 12, 2010, and ran for five seasons.

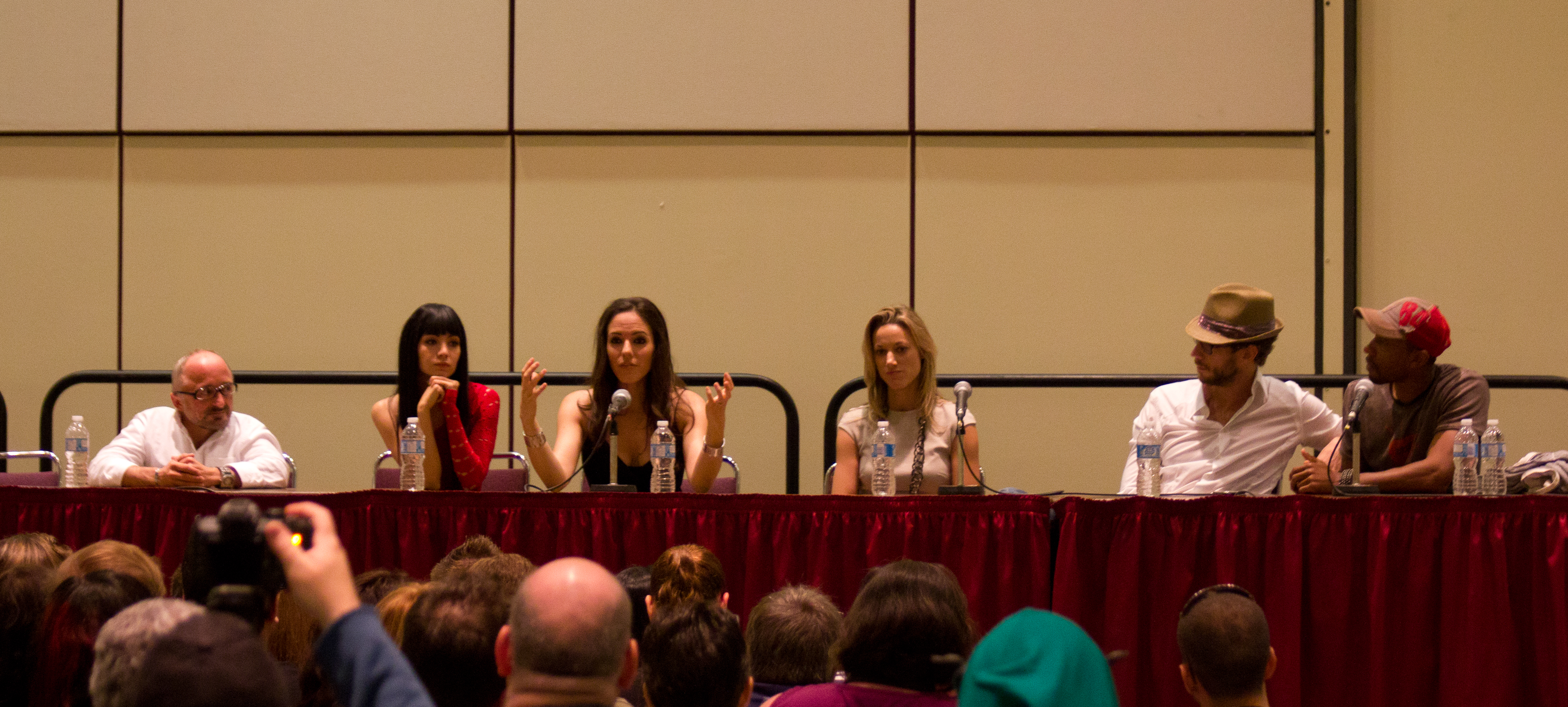
Main cast in August 2011 at Fan Expo Canada. From left: Rick Howland, Ksenia Solo, Anna Silk, Zoie Palmer, Kris Holden-Ried, and K. C. Collins.

== Main cast ==
=== Bo Dennis ===
Portrayed by: Anna Silk

A Succubus, she has the power to absorb the life force (the "chi", or Qi) of humans and Fae by drawing it out through their mouths. She feeds from chi intake; and heals from the absorption of chi and from the energy created by sexual encounters. She can also seduce and manipulate both humans and Fae with the touch of her skin. Though at first she could not feed without killing her sexual partners (both male and female), with Lauren's help she learned to control her sexual drive and chi-drawing powers so that she can have sex with both Fae and humans without injuring or killing them. She can only go a few days without feeding before the hunger overcomes her. Absorbing the chi of Faes can increase her strength; however, although Fae are stronger than humans and can better endure her feeding on them, she can drain their chi and leave them comatose or dead. She is best friends with Kenzi and is romantically involved with both Lauren and Dyson. When Lauren's life is threatened in "Death Didn't Become Him", a strange and extremely powerful alternate persona emerges from her, which drains the chi from multiple individuals at a distance of several meters, and she declares "there will be no more dark or light, only me." In the first season, Bo finally meets her birth mother, Aife, who is also a succubus. Towards the end of the second season, she learns that Trick is her maternal grandfather and that she is named after her grandmother, Isabeau. In the third season, Bo willingly enters into a monogamous relationship for the first time in her life when she asks Lauren to be with her.

=== Dyson ===
Portrayed by: Kris Holden-Ried

A Wolf-Shapeshifter and homicide detective in the human police force. He is 1,500 years old, very strong, possesses a sharp sense of smell, and is acutely knowledgeable about Fae politics. A member of the Light Fae, his true allegiance is to Trick rather than to the Ash. He falls in love with Bo while under orders from Trick to keep an eye on her, and is best friends with Hale, his Light Fae detective partner. In the Season 1 finale, he involuntarily sacrifices his love for Bo when he offers his wolf to the Norn in return for her giving Bo the strength to defeat her murderous and maniacal mother, Aife; but the Norn – who demanded his wolf the first time he asked a favor from her in "Brother Fae of the Wolves" – realizes that his wolf is no longer what he values most and takes his love for Bo and his ability to love anyone else again instead; leaving him with the memory of their relationship but unable to feel his passion for her. He makes efforts to remain friends with Bo, which is initially awkward when Bo can't understand why he is distant (until Bo comes to terms with his detachment and declares to Kenzi in "Can't See the Fae-Rest" that her relationship with Dyson is over). After reuniting with his old love, Ciara, their relationship is hampered by Dyson's reluctance to reveal his encounter with the Norn and what he had lost in the exchange; however, he eventually admits to her that he offered his wolf but it had cost him his ability to love anyone. This ability is restored by the Norn after Kenzi threatens to mutilate and cut down her Sacred Tree in "Into the Dark". Although the idea that a wolf mates for life was ascribed to his relationship with Bo, in "End Of A Line" the voodoo witch Laveau told Dyson that his "prison" (i.e. his love for Bo) was of his own making.

=== Kenzi ===
Portrayed by: Ksenia Solo

Mackenzie "Kenzi" Malikov: a human and Bo's best friend and sidekick, declared as Bo's "property" and "pet" to allow her to participate in Fae society. She suggests Bo use her neutrality and bewitching powers to her advantage to become a private investigator, with her as partner. Kenzi ran away from home at a young age and lived on the streets and underground for a long time before meeting Bo. A small-time criminal, somewhat compulsive pickpocket, and scam artist with a long rap sheet, she can speak Russian fluently and possesses excellent street-smarts. She prefers to be underestimated at first glance and tends to put up a facade of generic sidekick cowardice, silliness, and uselessness for camouflage and to keep herself out of harm's way. Her plentiful extended family, all local diaspora, provide a steady stream of shady connections, sources, and services, usually exchanged over the phone as "favors owed" or "favors called" (as prevalent in real-world Russian culture). This and her character's Russian streetwise slang lines, swagger, and attitudes are all quite authentic in both scripting and delivery, with in fact the only notable faux-Russianism in the series being Kenzi's name. Despite their differences, she and Bo quickly become close friends, with Bo choosing humanity rather than Fae in "It's a Fae, Fae, Fae, Fae World", after Kenzi risks her life to find out where Bo had been taken by Dyson and Hale, and calls out to Bo to help her break out of a spell she had been put under during the trial to determine her alignment with Light or Dark. She has a vast wardrobe of clothing and wigs to change her appearance at will. Kenzi and Hale became friends, and she frequently teases or assists him; and by the third season she has also endeared herself to Vex. Her character is the show's comic relief and primary source of its trademark banter, but being so far from the typical incompetent and bumbling "weakling human sidekick without any abilities", grants it much of its signature style. It can, however, also be noted that her thieving, though not of supernatural origin, is one of the most regularly used special skillsets in the show. Kenzi sacrificed herself to stop Bo's father returning to Earth in the Season Four finale, but although she was resurrected at the beginning of Season Five, she relocated to Spain as she wanted to get away from the fae world and the memories of Hale's death.

=== Dr. Lauren Lewis ===
Portrayed by: Zoie Palmer

A Human owned by the Ash as his property, she serves as a doctor and scientist for the Light Fae. She was seduced by Bo during their first meeting and hence fell in love with her. She has extensive knowledge of the different types of Fae and their abilities. In the first season, she helped Bo learn how to control her powers so that she could have sex with both Fae and humans without hurting or killing them. It is later revealed that she had a human girlfriend, Nadia, who had fallen into a coma five years earlier after contracting a mysterious virus while in the Congo with her. In exchange for her servitude, The Ash offered Lauren access to the Light Fae's laboratory and resources to find a cure for Nadia's condition. Lauren learned from Lachlan in "Masks" that she was tricked by the previous Ash: he ordered a Dark Fae Shaman to curse Nadia into a coma to insure that Lauren would do everything in her power to find an antidote to the fever that was killing Fae, and then pulled her into the Light clan's fold. After Bo (unbeknownst to Lauren) removed the curse, Lauren and Nadia reunited; but their relationship was soon shattered when it was revealed that Nadia had been infected by the Garuda and he could control her mind and body. Bo was forced to kill Nadia when she threatened Lauren's life leaving Lauren devastated. Grieving, Lauren seeks comfort in Bo and the two grow closer emotionally. In the Season 2 finale, Lauren relinquishes her chance for freedom from the Light Fae to stay with Bo, despite encouragement from Dyson to leave while she can.

In "Caged Fae", Bo asks Lauren to be together in a committed relationship. However, in "Delinquents", Tamsin visits Lauren to furtively carry out one of her mercenary tasks, and intentionally provokes Lauren by telling her that she and Bo kissed without Bo feeding from her (not knowing that the kiss was caused by Trick and Stella touching the Dawning invitation machine at the moment they shared a first kiss in "Fae-ge Against The Machine", which made the machine spark, and propelled Tamsin towards Bo to kiss her). Overwhelmed by all the stress and loss she had experienced, and feeling inadequate in satisfying Bo's succubus nature, Lauren tells Bo that she needs to take a "break" from the relationship. As time passes, however, Bo becomes concerned that it might not be a temporary separation. In "Adventures In Fae-bysitting", a part of Lauren's past is disclosed and we learn that her real name is Karen Beattie and that she is a fugitive wanted by the International Criminal Offences and Criminal Intelligence Bureau. In addition to English she is also fluent in Spanish, French and Swahili. In "Those Who Wander" Lauren feigns being through with Bo in the presence of Dr. Isaac Taft and rejects her to protect Bo, and herself, from him. After this encounter, Bo and Lauren go their separate ways. Lauren then sabotages Taft's plan to extract Dyson's DNA and transfer the cells into him so as to become a Wolf-Shapeshifter, and turns Taft into a human/Cabbit hybrid instead, making him an easy kill for Dyson. She goes missing thereafter. (The conversation that she and Dyson had during a phone call in "Sleeping Beauty School" showed that Dyson was aware of Lauren's motives for subjecting him to the deceptive procedure.) In "Turn to Stone", Lauren reveals to Crystal that she has a brother, they had been inseparable, and decided together "to change the world", but their cause had turned into blowing up pipelines. Lauren knew how to build pipe bombs and made them for her brother to position; however, one location was supposed to have been deserted but wasn't, and eleven people were killed in the explosion. This led Lauren (then known as Karen Beattie) to go on the run, change her identity, and keep running ever since. Lauren confesses that not a day goes by that she doesn't hate herself for what happened. (By the details in the ICOCIB wanted poster, the incident occurred in 1998, when Lauren was 17 or 18 years old.) In "Let the Dark Times Roll", Bo and Lauren are reunited at a Dark Fae party after the passage of a month, during which Lauren's memory of Bo was removed by The Wanderer. They jump into each other's arms and kiss passionately. Lauren told Bo that she had fled for her life after the Una Mens began to kill humans. The Dark Fae (i.e. The Morrigan) came looking for her, offering refuge, protection, and freedom to come and go as she pleased in exchange for working for the clan. When Bo tells Lauren that she can offer her protection by claiming her, Lauren turns her down. After being owned by The Ash for over five years, Lauren doesn't want to be owned by anyone, even Bo. Bo walks away, stunned and bewildered by Lauren's response. In "Dark Horse", Bo and Lauren reconciled after Bo saved Lauren from Massimo. Lauren saw that Bo was wearing the necklace gift from Lauren she had found in "Turn to Stone". When a defiant Lauren tells Bo that she's not afraid of the Fae, Bo admiringly told her, "You really are Dark"; to which Lauren replied, "No, Bo. I'm yours." Bo starts to leave, but turns around and walks back to Lauren and kisses her.

At the start of Season 5, Bo and Lauren have remained good friends, putting behind their previous tensions. In Big in Japan, when Bo felt that she was alone, following Kenzi's departure, Lauren was among those who reassured Bo that she would never be alone, because she stole her heart. In Here Comes the Night, Bo and Lauren had sex again since their breakup in Season 3. They were seen by Tamsin, who had initiated a sexual relationship with Bo and thought the two were now "girlfriends". When Bo realized their 'friends with benefits' had been misunderstood she told Tamsin that she did love her, but not in a romantic way. In "End of Faes", Tamsin told Bo that it didn't matter where her body was, because her heart will always be with Lauren; that she and Lauren will always be a couple, even when they were not. Afterwards, Bo stopped Lauren to talk about what happened between them the day before and told her, "There's always going to be a reason for us not to be together. And I don't want to put this off any longer." Bewildered, Lauren simply says, "Oh, boy." Bo asks, "'Oh, boy', no. Or 'Oh, boy', yes?" Tamsin later told Lauren, "I entered the game and I lost. That's life. The best woman won. I'm over it. You should be, too." — letting Lauren know that she and Bo should get back together. Later, Bo, Lauren and Dyson are searching for Mark, Dyson's son. Bo had to leave to find Iris, one of the Ancient Fae, while Lauren and Dyson searched for Mark, but before they went different ways, Lauren told Bo, "Oh, boy, yes"; letting her know that she, too, wanted to resume their relationship.

With encouragement from Hades, Lauren developed what she thought was a formula for longevity because it meant she could be with Bo forever. She later discovered that she had, instead, turned herself into a Fae conduit, channeling the abilities of any Fae she touched. She soon realized that she was losing herself and in "Judgement Fae" took an antidote to make herself human again. But not wanting to burden Bo with being with her as she aged and eventually died, Lauren broke up with Bo for a second time in their history to spare her from that inevitable pain. In the series finale, "Rise", Dyson confessed to Lauren that he didn't worry so much about Bo when the two of them were together. He encouraged her to be with Bo because although it was complicated, it was worth it. Lauren told Dyson that she had worried about what would happen to Bo after she died and then realized she didn't have to, because Bo would always have him in her life. In the end, when Bo told Lauren that the future was completely uncertain, Lauren replied "Not completely." She then said to Bo, "I, human, Lauren Lewis, want to spend the rest of my life with you, succubus, Bo Dennis." To which Bo responded, "I always thought that because of who I am, that I couldn't have a relationship. Let alone with a human. And then I met you." When Lauren asked, "Do you think that we can do this?" Bo answered "I do." They embraced and kissed, together again for good.

=== Fitzpatrick "Trick" McCorrigan ===
Portrayed by: Rick Howland

The Bartender and owner of the only Fae pub in town, The Dal Riata, which is neutral ground where Light and Dark Fae can freely socialize and find sanctuary. Trick is very powerful: he is a Blood Sage and can alter fate by writing it with his blood. Once known as the Blood King, he forced the truce and wrote the decrees that ended the war between Light and Dark Fae, and is on equal terms with the Fae Elders. Compared to other Fae, who have contempt for humans, he is tolerant and often fond of humans, even trading away his most prized possession to help save Kenzi's life in "Food for Thought". He respects Lauren and when necessary seeks her opinion and expertise with matters involving Fae. Trick is extremely reluctant to use his blood powers as it can have unforeseen consequences: in "Blood Lines", his writing a culmination where Aife's maternal instincts emerge and stop her from hurting and killing Bo not only leaves him weakened and wounded from the loss of blood, but in "Lachlan's Gambit" he tells Lachlan that it awakened the Garuda. Near the end of the second season, he reveals to Bo that he is her maternal grandfather.

=== Hale Santiago ===
Portrayed by: K. C. Collins

A Siren and Dyson's colleague as another Light Fae undercover agent in the human police force. He can pacify, control, and kill humans and Fae alike with his whistling; in addition, he can cure pain and heal wounds with it. He is the son of the leader of one of the three most powerful and wealthiest Light Fae clans, the Clan Zamora, but despite his family's social status he makes his own way in life, preferring to create his own connections and leverage (although he allows Bo and Kenzi to use his high-class social contacts when they need to infiltrate an upper-crust Fae event). Hale becomes good friends with Kenzi, with an undercurrent of mutual attraction gradually developing between them. He helps save Kenzi's life using his siren's whistle to cauterize her wound in the Season 2 finale. In the third season, he becomes the acting Ash after Lachlan's death. Hale dies protecting Kenzi from Massimo after proposing to her in "End Of A Line".

== Recurring cast ==
- Paul Amos as Vex: a Mesmer. A sadomasochist Dark Fae with a sarcastic and raunchy sense of humor, he can control people's bodies against their will, including forcing them to kill themselves or commit murder. Vex is a favorite of the Dark Elders and has a "like-hate" relationship with The Morrigan, serving as her hit man. He plays a pivotal role against the Garuda when Bo recruits him for her team and he uses his powers to delay the Garuda using Trick's blood to reverse the Blood Laws and reignite a war between Light and Dark. (Original Pilot, "Vexed"; Season 1, 2, 3, 4, 5)
- Emmanuelle Vaugier as Evony Fleurette Marquise: The Morrigan. A Leanan sídhe and the ruthless, cunning, and vengeful leader of the local Dark Fae, she can melt and dissolve flesh with her touch. She runs a talent agency in the human world where she represents young musicians and artists while feeding off their talents and stealing their lives in exchange for fame. (Season 1, 2, 3, 4, 5)
- Inga Cadranel as Aife (aka Saskia in Season 1): a Succubus and Bo's birth mother. She is the daughter of Trick, the Blood King, and Isabeau. After rebelling against the truce imposed between the Light and Dark Fae and killing a Dark Elder, she is delivered to the Dark Fae for execution. Instead of being put to death, she endures many centuries of imprisonment, torture, and rape by a Dark King before she is able to escape. She masterminds a suicide bombing that kills most of the Light Fae Elders and critically injures The Ash. (Season 1, 3, 4, 5)
- Rachel Skarsten as Tamsin: a Valkyrie. Dyson's new detective partner after Hale became the acting Ash. A mercenary and bounty hunter aligned with the Dark Fae, she is not pleased with being forced to work with a Light Fae partner. She is building a case against Bo for attacking and feeding on a member of the Dark Fae, and rendering him unconscious. Initially, she has no problem showing her distaste for Bo or Dyson's infatuation with her, but develops an attraction and respect for Bo, to the point of questioning her own loyalties. At the end of Season 3, she sped her truck towards the ghostly figure on the road that she thought was Bo's father, and drove off a cliff with Dyson sitting next to her. She was reborn at the beginning of Season 4, and firmly took Bo's side. In Season 5, she moved in as Bo's roommate and initiated a "friends with benefits" relationship with Bo, later confessing to Bo that she was in love with her. Tamsin was heartbroken when Bo responded that she loved her, but not in a romantic way. Tamsin moved out in "End of Faes", exasperatingly telling Bo, "You and Lauren, you two, you'll just always be a couple. Even when you're not." Later she told Lauren, "I entered the game, I lost. That's life. The best woman won. I'm over it." Tamsin afterwards renewed her friendship with Bo. After Lauren broke up with Bo for a second time, Tamsin visited Bo to comfort her and was unknowingly seduced by Hades, who had transformed himself into Bo's likeness. Tamsin was impregnated by him. In the series finale, "Rise", she gave birth to a daughter. All Valkyries die during childbirth, but before dying Tamsin reassured Bo that she would always live through her daughter (Dagny), her legacy, and asked Bo to look after her. Bo promised that she would do everything to protect her. (Season 3, 4, 5)
- Vanessa Matsui as Cassie: an Oracle. (Season 1, 4, 5)
- Kate Trotter as The Norn: an Ancient with the power to grant one's strongest desire in exchange for that which they hold dearest. When Bo was fighting her mother, Aife, Dyson sought her intervention, for the second time in his life, and offered her his "wolf" in return for transferring his strength to Bo; but he did not realize that what he now valued most was his love for Bo, and The Norn took his ability to love her or anyone else, instead. (In "End Of A Line" the voodoo witch Laveau told Dyson that his love "prison" – i.e. his love for Bo – was of his own making.) The Norn returned Dyson's love passion after Kenzi threatened to cut down her Sacred Tree with a chainsaw. (Season 1, 2)
- Clé Bennett as the Ash: leader of the Light Fae. He wants Bo to choose alignment with the Light, and orders Lauren to find a way to distract Bo so as to prevent her from attacking and killing Vex – which could have jeopardized the peace between the Fae clans and given the Morrigan a reason to execute Bo. He is badly injured in an assassination attempt by Bo's mother, Aife, and left in a comatose state on life support at the end of Season 1. (Original Pilot, "Vexed"; Season 1)
- Aron Tager as Mayer: a Luck Fae. He is a bookmaker running a gambling business with both Fae and human clients. He was Bo's Dark Fae contact and told her where Vex could be found. His niece, Cassie, is an Oracle and in exchange for a favor allowed Bo to meet with her and reveal information about her birth mother. (Original Pilot, "Vexed"; Season 1)
- Vincent Walsh as Lachlan: the second Ash. A Nāga, he wins the position of The Ash in a stag hunt after the previous Ash is left comatose. He is a stickler for rules and a commanding leader who does not hesitate to assert his authority, punish insubordination, and do away with anyone who threatens the Light Fae and the secret existence of the Fae. The Nāga has the power to kill the Garuda with its venom; but after losing his other heads violently for their toxin, Lachlan knows he cannot defeat his ancient enemy and before facing him in a fight to the death he has Lauren draw his venom so that she can turn it into a weapon for Bo to kill the Garuda with. (Season 2)
- Lina Roessler as Ciara: a Fairy-Scuffock hybrid. The warrior daughter of a Fairy father and Scáthach mother with powers of lightning-fast velocity, she taught the art of war to Dyson and his wolf-shapeshifter pack. Referred to as a Fairy Queen by Trick and Bo. She is a past love of Dyson, and they are reunited after the passage of centuries and become romantically involved; but although she is in love with Dyson, he is unable to respond in kind since The Norn has taken his ability to love. While she is initially treated frostily by Bo and Kenzi, Bo eventually comes to consider her a friend. She is killed by the Garuda when she shifts in front of Bo to protect her from the thrust of his sword. (Season 2)
- Anthony Lemke as Ryan Lambert: a Dark Fae Loki. He is a wealthy playboy who amassed a fortune as an inventor, alchemist, and supplier of rare and costly items. He crashes Bo's birthday party to give her an engraved bracelet that, she later learns, can protect her from a species of Fae. After Bo's relationship with Dyson ends and her romance with Lauren is interrupted when Nadia is released from her coma, she and Ryan become lustful lovers without her knowing that he is Dark, and he lets Bo feed off him. (Season 2)
- Athena Karkanis as Nadia: Lauren's human girlfriend. She accompanied Lauren to the Congo as a photographer and while there The Ash caused her to be stricken by a mysterious illness that leaves her in a coma – thereby manipulating Lauren into pledged servitude to him and the Light Fae. Bo is forced to kill her when she becomes possessed by the Garuda and attacks Lauren, threatening her life. (Season 2)
- Hayley Nault as the Nain Rouge: a divine Fae spirit that likes to observe tragic events and materializes as a young girl. The Nain Rouge appears to Bo when unexplained Fae deaths begin to occur and gives Bo a vision wherein she is the cause of Trick's death. When the reemergence of the Fae's ancient enemy, the Garuda, begins to create strange events in nature, the Nain Rouge answers Bo's call to show herself and tells Bo that for her to defeat the Garuda she needs to build a united team of Light and Dark Fae. (Season 2)
- Raoul Trujillo as The Garuda: an ancient and fiendish powerful enemy of the Fae. The Garuda transforms into a gigantic fiery eagle, and can possess and control its victims. Its source of food is anger and rage, and can only be killed with the venom of a Nāga. When the Blood King (Trick) writes the truce and Blood Laws that ended the Great War between Light and Dark, the Garudas dwindle as they starve to death until only one is left, remaining dormant for eons. When Trick uses his blood powers to stop Aife from hurting and killing Bo, it revives the Garuda, which then comes in search of Trick to force him into using his blood to repeal the Laws and reignite the war between Light and Dark. He is killed by Bo with Lachlan's venom. (Season 2)
- Aaron Ashmore as Nate: Kenzi's boyfriend. Kenzi and Nate used to be neighbours when she was six years old and they meet again by coincidence sixteen years later when he answered an ad for a musician gig at Bo's surprise birthday party. Kenzi broke up with him when the Garuda's threat was most imminent and could have endangered his life, and she was also worried that The Morrigan would steal Nate's life after she offered to be his talent agent. (Season 2)
- Rob Archer as Bruce: a bodyguard and hatchet man for The Morrigan (species unknown). (Season 3, 4, 5)
- Shawn Doyle as Dr. Isaac Taft: a psychotic human scientist and Fae hunter. He appears at Lauren's apartment delivering a research award after she fails to attend the special presentation ceremony. Dr. Taft deceptively courts Lauren until, after several failed attempts, he convinced her to join him in performing cutting edge medical research in his private laboratory. He knows about the Fae and Lauren's involvement with the supernatural race, and wants her expertise about them to inflict cruel revenge against the Fae after his brother was beheaded by one and he was blamed for the crime. Taft kidnaps Dyson to extract his DNA for use on himself, but Lauren secretly sabotages the DNA transplant and turns him into a human-Cabbit hybrid. He is killed and eaten by Dyson. (Season 3)
- Deborah Odell as Stella Nashira: a Lodestar. She is recruited by Trick to mentor Bo in her preparation for the tests she has to face during The Dawning. She and Trick fall in love and leave together for Scotland in the season finale. In the pre-Season 4 webisode "Prophecy", Trick explained to Hale that he and Stella had ended their relationship. (Season 3)
- Tim Rozon as Massimo: The Druid. Massimo's mother is Evony Fleurette Marquise (The Morrigan), who gave birth to him in the 1980s but then abandoned him and ordered Vex to raise him. (Season 3, 4)
- Christine Horne as The Keeper: the inquisitor of The Una Mens. (Season 4)
- Kyle Schmid as Rainer: a rebel Fae. (Season 4)
- Ali Liebert as Crystal: a waitress at the diner Lauren worked in while in hiding. The two started to develop a bond until Crystal had sex with Lauren after the Fae coerced her to do it so as to gain her trust, and thereafter kidnap Lauren. They were both chained and locked up in a cell together. (Season 4)
- Mia Kirshner as Clio: an Elemental Nymph. Clio had the ability to commune with all four elements of nature - Earth, Wind, Fire and Water. She helped Dyson transverse the intersecting planes of existence, which made it possible for them to get on and off the Death Train. (Season 4)
- Amanda Walsh as Zee: an Ancient and aka Zeus. (Season 5)
- Luke Bilyk as Mark: a Shapeshifter and son of Dyson. (Season 5)
- Noam Jenkins as Heratio: an Ancient and aka Hera. (Season 5)
- Shanice Banton as Iris: an Ancient and aka Nyx. (Season 5)
- Lisa Marcos as Alicia Welles: a human. (Season 5)
- Eric Roberts as Hades: an Ancient and King of the Underworld, Tartarus, and Bo's father. (Season 5)
