= Lost Girl season 1 =

Lost Girl
- Season 1
- North America DVD cover
- Starring: Anna Silk; Kris Holden-Ried; Ksenia Solo; Zoie Palmer; Rick Howland; K. C. Collins
- No. of episodes: 13

Release
- Original network: Showcase
- Original release: September 12 – December 12, 2010

Season chronology
- Next → Season 2

Lost Girl is a Canadian supernatural drama television series that premiered on Showcase on September 12, 2010. The series was created by Michelle Lovretta and is produced by Jay Firestone, Prodigy Pictures Inc., and Keyframe Digital Productions, Inc., with the participation of the Canadian Television Fund (Canada Media Fund), and in association with Shaw Media. It follows the life of a bisexual succubus named Bo, played by Anna Silk, as she learns to control her superhuman abilities, help those in need, and discover the truth about her origins.

Lost Girl premiered on Showcase on September 12, 2010. Its debut became "the highest-rated Canadian scripted series premiere of all time on Showcase."

The series premiered in Australia on Sci Fi on July 14, 2011. In the United Kingdom and Ireland, the series premiered on Syfy (UK) on September 1, 2011. In the United States, the series premiered on Syfy on January 16, 2012.

== Plot ==
It’s kind of tough growing up thinking that you might have a shot at being prom queen and find out that you're part of some ageless secret race that feeds on humans.

— Bo, Where There's a Will, There's a Fae (1.02)

Bo is a Succubus who grew up in an adopted human family, unaware of her non-human nature and of the Fae world she descended from. She began to feel "different" when she entered puberty and didn't know she was not normal until she accidentally killed her high school boyfriend by draining his life energy during her first sexual encounter. When she told her parents what had happened, they broke the news to Bo that she had been adopted (see "Raging Fae"). Not knowing what she was and what she had done, Bo hated herself and ran away from home, exchanging her previous life for one without family or friends, moving from place to place and assuming a false identity whenever she killed again.

In the first episode, Bo saves a young human woman, Kenzi, from a rapist who had surreptitiously drugged her with a "roofie" in her drink. The two quickly become friends and Kenzi decides they should team up to create a Fae/Human detective agency. Confronted by the Fae leaders of the local territory with a demand for her to choose a side – either "Light" or "Dark" – Bo declares herself neutral, deciding instead to side with humans after Kenzi risked her life to find out where Bo had been taken by force and what they were doing to her. Most of the Fae considered Bo an unknown entity that should either be eliminated as a risk to their secret existence or exploited for their benefit. Throughout the season, Bo learns more about the Fae world and herself while she searches for information about her origins. Along the way, Bo also develops romantic relationships with both Dyson, a Light Fae wolf shapeshifter and police detective; and Lauren, a human doctor and scientist in servitude to the Light Fae.

== Episodes ==
No. overall	No. in season	Title	Directed by	Written by	Original release date
1	1	"It's a Fae, Fae, Fae, Fae World"	Érik Canuel	Michelle Lovretta	September 12, 2010
Bo is a young woman who has been living on the run for years, trying to figure out why she kills people (both men and women) when she kisses them. After leaving someone she kills out in the open, she is contacted by a group called The Fae. She discovers who and what she is, and is told to join one of two tribes, either the Light or the Dark. She refuses and chooses the side of humanity instead.
2	2	"Where There's a Will, There's a Fae"	Robert Lieberman	Peter Mohan	September 19, 2010
Bo agrees to help a will-o'-the-wisp find the person who stole his treasure in exchange for information on her birth-parents. More is revealed of the world of the Fae, including some species of Fae and their society. Bo also gains two allies in her search for her truths.
3	3	"Oh Kappa, My Kappa"	Paul Fox	Michelle Lovretta	September 26, 2010
Bo and Kenzi open their own private investigation office. Their first job is to find a missing student at a local college. Kenzi goes undercover as a student at the college and Bo joins campus security to uncover what happened. Meanwhile, Bo and Dyson's relationship goes on the rocks and another species of Fae is revealed. Note: This episode was listed as "Sorority" in the USA.
4	4	"Faetal Attraction"	Steve DiMarco	Jeremy Boxen	October 3, 2010
Bo tries to handle being rejected by Dyson with the help of Kenzi. Dyson tries the same with Hale's help as well. A fury and her husband meet Bo and the fury tries to hire Bo to kill a human. She refuses and all hell breaks loose.
5	5	"Dead Lucky"	John Fawcett	Emily Andras	October 17, 2010
Bo is hired by a Dark Fae named Mayer to find out how a human managed to win a bet with him. The reward for finding out is having an Oracle reveal something of Bo's past to her. Bo solves the mystery by finding out that a Fae that can jump between human corpses, called a Hsien, managed the deed. In the end, the answers Bo seeks are not given, but she does learn one thing. Her mother is alive, and coming for Bo.
6	6	"Food for Thought"	John Fawcett	Pamela Pinch	October 24, 2010
Bo and Kenzi follow Lauren as she tends to a sick Aswang, a type of Fae that is a carrion eater. Kenzi eats some soup that made the Aswang ill and becomes gravely ill as well. Bo and Lauren attempt to locate the source of the disease, a Basilisk, that is killing the pair before it is too late. Trick sells something precious to him for Kenzi's sake, and Dyson's relationship with Kenzi becomes stronger. Bo also finds that with Lauren's help she has more control over her powers and can feed without killing humans any longer.
7	7	"ArachnoFaebia"	John Fawcett	Emily Andras	October 31, 2010
Kenzi is running a scam in which she is cleansing homes of evil spirits. She does so in a home where a murder/suicide took place. In the process of doing so, she is bitten by a Djieiene, an Under Fae creature that is similar to a giant spider. Over the course of the episode, Bo is also bitten then Hale and the paranoia created makes them try to kill each other. The only hope for them to be saved is Lauren and Dyson who are running out of time.
8	8	"Vexed"	John Fawcett	Michelle Lovretta	November 7, 2010
Bo gets a possible lead on her mother from a vampire. That lead takes her to an inmate on death row named Lou Ann, but it seems to be a false lead. The vampire is then found murdered, and Bo concludes that there is another Fae involved. She uses her Dark Fae contacts to find that the murderer is a Fae named Vex who is a kind of Fae called a Mesmer. She attempts to get help from the Light Fae and is refused. Lauren is forced to betray Bo by The Ash, and her relationship with Bo is damaged severely. Bo then attempts to get answers from and revenge on Vex, but he is more powerful than Bo expected. Note: "Vexed" is the original pilot shown to Showcase to obtain the green-light for the series.
9	9	"Fae Day"	Steve DiMarco	Jeremy Boxen	November 14, 2010
The Fae are celebrating their holiest day called La Shoshain. In the middle of the partying at Trick's bar, a Banshee calls out the impending death of one of the people there. Bo becomes involved with solving a long held family fight from one of the Noble Fae families and Kenzi becomes romantically involved with the brother marked for death. Bo calls for a Agallamh which forces the two brothers of the family to attempt to reconcile their differences. Through the story we also learn about Fae history and that Trick is a being known as the Blood King who set out the rules of the Fae in the past.
10	10	"The Mourning After"	Paul Fox	Michelle Lovretta	November 21, 2010
Bo is hired to investigate the suicide of a woman by her sister. In the process of doing so, she encounters a Dark Fae succubus named Saskia. Saskia displaces Kenzi in Bo's life, and the new pair attempt to solve the mystery. Trick in the meantime is threatened with the loss of his bar, The Dal Riata, when a business associate arrives to claim an item from him which seems to have vanished. Kenzi agrees to help Trick locate the missing item by summoning a Lightning Bird for him. Bo comes to battle an Albaster, who is the natural enemy of the succubi as her investigation continues with deadly results and Bo making a decision about Saskia's involvement in her life.
11	11	"Faetal Justice"	Robert Lieberman	Peter Mohan	November 28, 2010
Dyson wakes up outside of a club with a recently deceased Dark Fae redcap named Ba'al beside him and blood all over his body. He obtains sanctuary from Trick, and discovers that he has no memories of what happened to him, and asks for help from Bo to find out why. In the meantime, The Morrigan blames Dyson for the death of Ba'al, an associate of her favorite Vex and looks for revenge on Dyson for this. Both The Morrigan and The Ash attempt to convince Dyson to give himself up but without success. Bo in the meantime searches at a Dark Fae owned club which Vex runs trying to solve the mystery. She discovers that there is more to the place than is on the surface and discovers the truth of what happened.
12	12	"(Dis)Members Only"	Steve DiMarco	Jeremy Boxen	December 5, 2010
A friend from Kenzi's past asks for her help in finding out what happened to a missing relative. To do so, Bo and Dyson pose as a married couple to investigate a country club while Kenzi works as an employee there. They discover that a Dark Fae, called a Land Wight, is responsible for the many disappearances there. Dyson demands that Trick tells Bo what they know or he will. Dyson and Bo come to an understanding about their relationship. But Saskia returns and tries to kill Dyson, however Bo saves Dyson at the last moment.
13	13	"Blood Lines"	Robert Lieberman	Michelle Lovretta	December 12, 2010
In the first season finale, Dyson and Trick finally tell Bo what they know about her past and Saskia is revealed to be Bo's mother. Saskia, now known by her true name Aife, begins a plan to cause a war between the Light and Dark Fae. To do so she attacks the Light Fae Elders and kills many of them. Bo, upset with her friends not telling her the truth, turns her back on them one by one except for Kenzi who tries to help Bo find a way to stop her mother from completing her plans. Lauren is tending to the critically injured, and gives Bo a means to find an amulet that will protect her from her mother's powers. Bo promises to make amends with Lauren after it is over and they share a kiss before Bo leaves. Trick makes a sacrifice to help Bo, and Dyson loses what is most important to him to the Norn to give Bo a chance to overcome her mother.

== Cast and characters ==
=== Main cast ===
- Anna Silk as Bo
- Kris Holden-Ried as Dyson
- Ksenia Solo as Kenzi
- Zoie Palmer as Dr. Lauren Lewis
- Rick Howland as Fitzpatrick "Trick" McCorrigan
- K. C. Collins as Hale Santiago

=== Recurring cast ===
- Clé Bennett as The Ash
- Inga Cadranel as Saskia / Aife
- Emmanuelle Vaugier as Evony Fleurette Marquise / The Morrigan.
- Paul Amos as Vex
- Aron Tager as Mayer

== Production ==
On November 16, 2008, Prodigy Pictures issued a press release that they had been commissioned by Canwest (Canwest Global Communications Corp.) to produce a pilot for Lost Girl, a drama about a young woman with supernatural powers. On August 13, 2009, Canwest announced that the Showcase television channel, a subsidiary of the main company, had given the green-light for a 13-episode, one-hour supernatural drama series named Lost Girl. On April 6, 2010, Prodigy Pictures reported that "principal photography is underway for 13 one-hour episodes of the new original Canadian fantasy-noir series, Lost Girl." Filming will take place at a West Toronto soundstage and on location in the vicinities of Toronto and Hamilton until June 25, 2010. The series is set to air on Showcase in the fall. Lost Girl follows supernatural seductress Bo (Anna Silk), a Succubus who feeds on the sexual energy of mortals. Bo’s succubus nature tangles her in a sexy, romantic love-triangle with Dyson (Kris Holden-Reid), a shape-shifting Fae and homicide detective, and Lauren (Zoie Palmer), a human doctor who has found a way through science to help give Bo the sexual self-control she's been aching for. Navigating this complicated life with Bo is her human confidante and street-smart survivor, Kenzi (Ksenia Solo). Writers include Michelle Lovretta; Peter Mohan; Jeremy Boxen; Emily Andras; and Pamela Pinch. A companion website for the series is being produced concurrently and will launch with the show to give viewers an unprecedented, interactive experience." The series was aimed for a September 2010 release date.

On June 22, 2010, Keyframe Digital Productions Inc. reported that they had been given the contract for visual effects on the first thirteen episodes of Lost Girl.

As part of the promotion of the series, an official site was opened at the beginning of August 2010 at www.lostgirlseries.com. It contained a short trailer for the series and a summary of information on the show and its characters. On August 20, 2010, "Lost Girl: The Interactive Motion Comic" was released as a lead-in to the series. On the same date, a press release indicated that Lost Girl cast and crew would be making an appearance at Fan Expo Canada in Toronto on August 27–29, 2010, where they would be answering questions about the show and have promotional items available for audience members as well.

Lost Girl premiered on Showcase on September 12, 2010. The show's debut became "the highest-rated Canadian scripted series premiere of all time on Showcase."

The first season episode "Vexed" (1.08) is the original pilot shown to Showcase to obtain the green-light for the series.

On May 18, 2011, Syfy (U.S.) announced that it had acquired 26 episodes (Season One and Season Two) of Lost Girl from Prodigy Pictures.

The United States debut of Lost Girl on January 16, 2012, was announced by Syfy on December 12, 2011. Episodes broadcast by Syfy in the United States are edited from their original 44:00 minutes to allow more time for commercial advertisements.

== Home media release ==
In Canada, Entertainment One, Ltd. released the DVD of Season One on April 24, 2012. In Australia (Region 4), Sony Pictures Home Entertainment released Season 1 on DVD on November 23, 2011; In the United States (Region 1), Giant Ape Media (Funimation SC) released the Season 1 uncut episodes "not seen on Syfy" on DVD and Blu-ray on October 23, 2012. In the United Kingdom and Ireland (Region 2), Sony Pictures Home Entertainment released Season 1 on DVD on February 25, 2013.

== Reception ==
=== Ratings ===
Ratings for the 9 p.m. series premiere on September 12, 2010, was over "400,000 viewers (2+)" and "another 184,000 (2+)" for the episode rerun at 10:40 p.m., making Lost Girl the "highest-rated Canadian scripted series premiere of all time on Showcase."

=== Critical response and popularity ===
The review aggregator website Rotten Tomatoes reported a 75% approval rating with an average rating of 7.4 out of 10 based on 12 reviews. The consensus reads: "Strong storytelling and intriguing characters help make Lost Girl a better-than-average supernatural/sci-fi series, even if the special effects leave something to be desired." On Metacritic, the season scored 68 out of 100, based on 11 critics, indicating "generally favorable reviews".

In Canada, Rob Salem of the Toronto Star described the show as one that "definitely bears watching". Vladislav Tinchev, writer for the German site Serienjunkies wrote that the series would benefit from "revealing more background information about the represented world," rather than spend time on "clumsy action scenes". But Tinchev pointed out that "Lost Girl is not lost at all, and has immediately won the audience and entertains them well. And there is nothing wrong with that, because TV series need not be world-shaking events."

In anticipation of its United States premiere, Brian Lowry of Variety wrote: "At first glance, Lost Girl looks like another one of those Canadian imports picked up mostly for financial reasons. The pilot, however, proves unexpectedly fun—a sort of diluted version of True Blood... but the show has wit, style and an enticing lead in the leather-clad Anna Silk." Writing for The New York Times, Mike Hale said: "Like other fantasy-tinged shows on Syfy and USA, it offers the minor pleasures of formulaic fantasy and weekly puzzle solving, though in a cheaper-looking and less original package than usual...." In a post-premiere review for The Huffington Post, Mauren Ryan wrote: "No one can say there's been a dearth of genre-tinged programs on television in recent years. The vampire boom of the mid-aughts was followed by the zombie bonanza of the last couple of years; all in all, we're awash in various undead and otherworldly creatures...But one of the reasons Lost Girl has made such a big impression on me...is because the Syfy show does what so many genre programs fail to do these days: It has fun with its premise...But don't expect Lost Girl to be perfect: Bo's universe can seem constricted at times, the weekly clients and monsters aren't always interesting and occasionally the storytelling has abrupt moments. But my occasional complaints have been overwhelmed by my growing appreciation of what creator Michelle Lovretta has done with this light drama: She's created a Hero's Journey with a self-confident woman — a succubus, no less — at the center of it...Lovretta has done something subversively impressive with Lost Girl. She's built a whole show around the idea of a woman who is learning just how much she can or should take from others, and how much she can rely on herself."

The relationship between Bo and Lauren became popularly referred to as "Doccubus" after fans of the couple combined "Doctor" Lauren Lewis with Bo's "Succubus" species (i.e. Doc+cubus) to create the alias. The term became widely used by entertainment media and bloggers when referring to the pairing.

In a 2012 report by TiVo of television programs watched at bedtime, Lost Girl was rated one of the top ten, most watched shows.

In a Slate magazine 2012 year-end list of 15 favorite television shows that are a pleasure to watch, Lost Girl (on Syfy) was named "Number 1" on the list, and hailed as "Sexy, snarky, and Canadian."

=== Accolades ===
Year	Award	Category	Recipient	Result	Ref.
2011	Directors Guild of Canada	Production Design – Television Series	Ian Brock (for "Vexed")	Nominated	
2011	Directors Guild of Canada	Sound Editing – Television Series	Alex Bullick, James Robb, Tom Bjelic and John Laing (for "Dead Lucky")	Nominated	
2011	Gemini Awards	Best Performance by an Actress in a Featured Supporting Role in a Dramatic Series	Ksenia Solo	Won	
2011	Gemini Awards	Best Cross-Platform Project – Fiction	Zandro Chan, Jay Firestone, Lui Francisco, Tigh Walker	Nominated	
2011	Gemini Awards	Best Writing in a Dramatic Series	Michelle Lovretta	Nominated	
2011	Gemini Awards	Best Photography in a Dramatic Program or Series	David Greene csc	Nominated	
2011	Gemini Awards	Best Achievement in Casting	Jon Comerford, Lisa Parasyn	Nominated	
