= Series premiere =

First installment of an episodic entertainment series

A series premiere is the first aired installment of an episodic entertainment series, most often a television series. In the United States, many series premieres are aired in the fall time or, for mid-season replacements, either in the spring or late winter.

== As distinguished from a pilot ==
A television series' first episode often originates as a pilot, a standalone episode that is used to sell the show to a television network. At the time of its creation, the pilot is meant to be the testing ground to gauge whether a series will be successful. As such, "Pilot" is overwhelmingly the most common title used for a series premiere.

Sometimes a series' pilot may be aired as a later episode or never aired at all. For the Canadian supernatural drama Lost Girl, the pilot that sold the series to Showcase, "Vexed", was used as the eighth episode of the first series. In the case of Firefly, the original pilot ("Serenity") was intended to serve as the series premiere but was rejected by the network, and a new first episode, "Train Job", was shot specifically for broadcast.

Other television series are commissioned "straight-to-series" where a network orders a season without viewing any produced episodes, hence no episode is considered a pilot. The straight-to-series model is usually used when established talent is attached to a series, or it is based on an established property or franchise. Amazing Stories (1985–1987) is credited as one of the first series to be commissioned without a pilot. The model has seen a rise since Netflix popularized it.

== Most watched series premieres in the United States ==
Rank	Show	Viewers (in millions)	Rating	Date	Network
1	A Different World	38.9	31.3%	September 24, 1987	NBC
2	Undercover Boss	38.7	19.1%	February 7, 2010	CBS
3	The Last Precinct	39.7	—N/a	January 26, 1986	NBC
4	Dolly	37.4	24.7%	September 27, 1987	ABC
5	Veronica's Closet	35.07	23.3%	September 25, 1997	NBC
6	Twin Peaks	34.6	21.7%	April 8, 1990 (two hours)	ABC
7	Brothers and Sisters	31.722	—N/a	January 21, 1979	NBC
8	Full House	31.3	21.7%	September 22, 1987	ABC
9	Roseanne	30.8	23.7%	October 18, 1988	ABC
10	Grand Slam	30.765	—N/a	January 28, 1990	CBS
11	seaQuest DSV	30.4 (8–10pm)	17.8 rating	September 12, 1993	NBC
12	Chicken Soup	30.2	21.8%	September 12, 1989	ABC
13	Suddenly Susan	30.1	20.4%	September 19, 1996	NBC
14	Caroline in the City	30.0	20.5%	September 21, 1995	NBC
15	Delta	30.0	20.5%	September 15, 1992	ABC
16	Dear John	30.0	19.8%	October 6, 1988	NBC
17	The Single Guy	29.1	19.2	September 21, 1995	NBC
18	Frasier	28.1	19.3%	September 16, 1993	NBC

== See also ==
- Season premiere
- Season finale
- Series finale
