= Dead Lucky =

Dead Lucky may refer to:

== Literature ==
- Dead Lucky: Life after death on Mount Everest, 2007 memoir by Australian mountaineer Lincoln Hall
- The Dead Lucky, 2023 U.S. comic book limited series set in the Massive-Verse fictional milieu published by Image Comics
- Dead Lucky, a 2003 book by John Blake about Lord Lucan

== Television and film ==
- Dead Lucky (film), 1960 British crime drama
- Dead Lucky (TV series), 2018 Australian crime drama miniseries TV show
- "Dead Lucky", a 1988 series 4 episode of the British anthology TV show Screen Two
- "Dead Lucky", a 2010 episode of the Canadian TV show Lost Girl season 1

== Other uses ==
- The Dead Lucky, a fictional character from the Massive-Verse fictional milieu published by Image Comics

== See also ==
- Lucky (disambiguation)
- Dead (disambiguation)
