= Bob Keen =

British film director (born 1960)

Robert Keen
- Born: Robert Keen; 1960 (age 65–66)
- Occupations: Director, Make-up artist, Visual effects artist

Robert Keen is a British film director and make-up artist.

== Career ==
He has directed eight films, including The Lost World, but he has also written screenplays, as well as working on special, visual and make-up effects.

Keen directed the 1995 Canadian made-for-TV movie To Catch a Yeti. The plot involves Hank the Yeti makes friends with an American family (including the young girl) and trying to outwit two hunters, one of them named Big Jake played by Meat Loaf, hired by a New York businessman for his spoiled son. It aired on The Disney Channel January 12, 1995. RiffTrax parodied the film on May 1, 2015.

== Accolades ==
He has been nominated for six Saturn Awards, all for best make-up, including for his work on Hellraiser and Candyman.
