= To Catch a Yeti =

- Written by: Paul Adam
- Directed by: Bob Keen
- Starring: Meat Loaf; Rick Howland
- Music by: Jack Lenz; Brent Barkman; Carl Lenox
- Countries of origin: Canada; United Kingdom
- Original language: English

Production
- Producers: Noel Cronin; Lionel Shenken; Beverley Shenken-brin
- Cinematography: David Perrault
- Editor: Stewart Dowds
- Production companies: Dandelion Productions; Visual Productions

Original release
- Release: 8 March 1994

To Catch a Yeti is a 1994 British-Canadian made-for-TV movie, directed by Bob Keen and featuring Meat Loaf and Rick Howland. The film was shot over 13 days in Ontario, Canada in 1993, and first broadcast two years later.

== Plot ==
Billionaire Arnold Sturgeon (Mike Panton) hires two hunters, Big Jake Grizzly (Meat Loaf) and Blubber (Rick Howland), to capture a Himalayan yeti for his spoiled son (Jeff Moser). However, their quarry, a small yeti, instead stows away in the backpack of American mountaineer Dave Bristow (Jim Gordon) and returns with him to the United States. The Bristows' 10-year-old daughter Amy (Chantallese Kent) befriends this yeti and names him Hank. Big Jake and Blubber eventually track down Hank and kidnap him for their employer. In New York City, the Bristows rescue the yeti and hide him at their family cabin in the Adirondack Mountains, where the hunters attempt another kidnapping. The Bristows accompany Hank back to Himalayas, where he is reunited with his mate.

== Cast ==
- Jim Gordon as Dave Bristow
- Meat Loaf as Big Jake Grizzly
- Chantallese Kent as Amy Bristow
- Jeff Moser as Wesley Sturgeon
- Rick Howland as Blubber
- Mike Panton as Arnold Sturgeon
- Mona Matteo as Angelica Sturgeon
- Kevin Robbin as the voice of Hank

== Production ==
=== Screenplay ===
Director Bob Keen joined the project at the request of executive producer Noel Cronin, after the original director was fired and the film's budget cut by 60%. The original script was written by Paul Adam; it was about a father trying to get closer to his daughter and explored the cruelty of hunting and animal poaching. Lionel Shenken, the film's executive producer on the Canadian side, later rewrote Adam's screenplay. This version was used for the film, although Keen later dismissed it as "a mismatch of collective ideas."

=== Filming ===
Although largely set in New York, To Catch a Yeti was shot over 13 days in Ontario, Canada, by a mostly British crew. Meat Loaf was cast in the week before shooting began, after his predecessor withdrew from the project to appear in a sitcom. The filmmakers deliberately aimed to give their film a 1980s look and feel, reminiscent of releases by Amblin Entertainment during that era. Keen described Meat Loaf as "generous and professional" throughout the shoot; Meat Loaf and co-star Rick Howland boosted the morale of cast and crew by breaking into musical numbers between takes.

== Release ==
To Catch a Yeti’s television debut was on Canadian cable station Super Channel, March 8, 1994, and in the UK on The Movie Channel, May 4, 1994. The American premiere was The Disney Channel on January 12, 1995. In the United States, the film had a limited run on VHS by PolyGram Video and USA Films. It also received limited home video runs on Castle Filmes in Brazil and Videosonic in Greece.

== Reception ==
TV Guide described the film as a "low-budget ET knockoff" that "offers only a cute yeti puppet creation to delight small children and a comical performance by hefty rocker Meat Loaf to amuse their parents." David Parkinson for Radio Times called the film "harmless fun, with the snowman puppets anything but abominable." John Stanley's book Creature Features: The Science Fiction, Fantasy, and Horror Movie Guide rated the film 1.5 stars out of five, describing it as "inconsequential" and "kiddie-oriented." In 2011, Cyriaque Lamar, writing for Gizmodo, ranked To Catch A Yeti as one of the 10 worst films featuring Bigfoot or yetis. Sarah Dobbs cited the film as one in a series of low-budget productions released in the wake of Harry and The Hendersons (1987) that reimagined Bigfoot "as a kind of fuzzy babysitter." RiffTrax parodied the film on May 1, 2015.
