= Rob Archer =

Canadian actor and stuntman

- Born: August 9, 1975 (age 50); Canada
- Occupations: Actor, Stuntman
- Years active: 2001-present

Rob Archer (born August 9, 1975) is a Canadian actor and stuntman known for his roles as Bruce in Lost Girl, Krampus in A Christmas Horror Story and Knox in Ant-Man and the Wasp.

== Biography ==
Rob Archer grew up as an '80s kid, admiring the big-name slashers such as Jason Voorhees, Freddy Krueger and Michael Myers. However, at the age of twenty he opted to become a bodybuilder while all of his friends went off to college. His trainer's wife was a talent agent and insisted that he try out for acting. Archer recalled his first audition, "... it was a train-wreck. It was the most horrible thing I’d ever done. I remember afterwards getting into my car and I had tears streaming down my face, I was so embarrassed." After waiting a couple of months, Archer tried again and got bit parts in commercials. It was not until he got a role in Exit Wounds that he decided to take acting seriously. This was followed by years in films such as Bulletproof Monk, Red, Kick-Ass 2, RoboCop and Pixels as well as television shows such as Lost Girl, Mutant X, Alphas, XIII: The Series, Defiance, Beauty & the Beast and Warehouse 13.

Archer began gaining significant exposure for his role as the Krampus in the anthology horror film A Christmas Horror Story. He accepted the role as he felt the Krampus was an iconic creature and wanted to portray an icon on film. He described his portrayal as combining a "Marvel character with an animalistic nature". Three years later, Archer would join the cast of Ant-Man and the Wasp which is part of the Marvel Cinematic Universe.

== Filmography ==
Film roles
Year	Title	Role	Notes
2001	Exit Wounds	Extra	Uncredited
2003	Bulletproof Monk	Buzz	
2010	Repo Men	No Neck	Uncredited; Stunt actor
2010	Red	Muscleman	Uncredited; Stunt Actor
2012	The Samaritan	Vernon Hicks	
2013	Kick-Ass 2	Convict #2	
2014	RoboCop		Stunt performer
2015	Pixels	Seal	
2015	A Christmas Horror Story	Krampus	
2017	Undercover Grandpa	Rocky	
2017	The Circuit		
2017	Darken	Bard	
2017	Trench 11	Infected German Soldier	
2018	Incident in a Ghost Land	Fat Man	
2018	Ant-Man and the Wasp	Knox	
2018	22 Chaser	Musclehead	
2018	A Wakefield Project	Nathan Cross	
2022	The Man from Toronto	Oscar	

Television roles
Year	Title	Role	Notes
2003	Mutant X	Rucker	Episode: "Lest He Become"
2004	Mutant X	Sniper	Episode: "No Exit"
2010	Lost Girl	Large Man	Episode: "It's a Fae, Fae, Fae, Fae World"
2011-2012	Warehouse 13		Stunt performer; 3 episodes
2012	Alphas	Huge Muscular Man	Episode: "Alpha Dogs"
2012	Transporter: The Series	Giant Man	Uncredited; Episode: "The General's Daughter"
2012	Flashpoint	Jim the Biker	Uncredited; Episode: "Below the Surface"
2012	Nikita		Stunt performer; Episode: "Consequences"
2012	XIII: The Series	The Brain	Episode: "Punchout"
2013-2015	Defiance	BioMan (Ulysses, Churchill, Benedict)	Recurring
2013-2015	Lost Girl	Bruce	Recurring
2014	Beauty & the Beast	Chauffeur	Uncredited; Episode: "Recipe for Disaster"
2014	Warehouse 13	Death Knight	Uncredited; Episode: "A Faire to Remember"
2014	Reign		Stunt performer; Episode: "Liege Lord"
2016	Slasher	Prsioner	2 episodes
2016	Incorporated	Sayeed	Episode: "Downsizing"
2017	Shadowhunters		Stunt performer; 2 episodes
2017	Taken	Trucker	Episode: "Solo"
2017	Baroness von Sketch Show	Wade	Episode: "It's a Garment of Liberty"
