= Michelle Lovretta =

Canadian screenwriter and producer

Michelle Lovretta is a Canadian television writer and producer best known as the creator and executive producer of the television series Lost Girl and Killjoys. She has also written for Instant Star, Relic Hunter, Mutant X and The Secret Circle.

She was nominated for a Gemini Award in 2011 for Best Writing in a Dramatic Series for Lost Girl, and also in 2006 for Best Writing in a Dramatic Program or Mini-Series for the made-for-TV movie Hunt for Justice. In 2018 she was nominated for an Aurora Award for Best Visual Presentation for Killjoys Season 3.

Lovretta sold a feature film script called The Fishing Trip when she was 21 and in a screenwriting course at York University. She was selected to be a resident in a TV training program offered by the Canadian Film Centre and run by Norman Jewison in 1999 to teach people how to write for television. At the end of the residency her script for a program called Sherpa Love was purchased by CBC.
