= Rick Howland =

Canadian actor

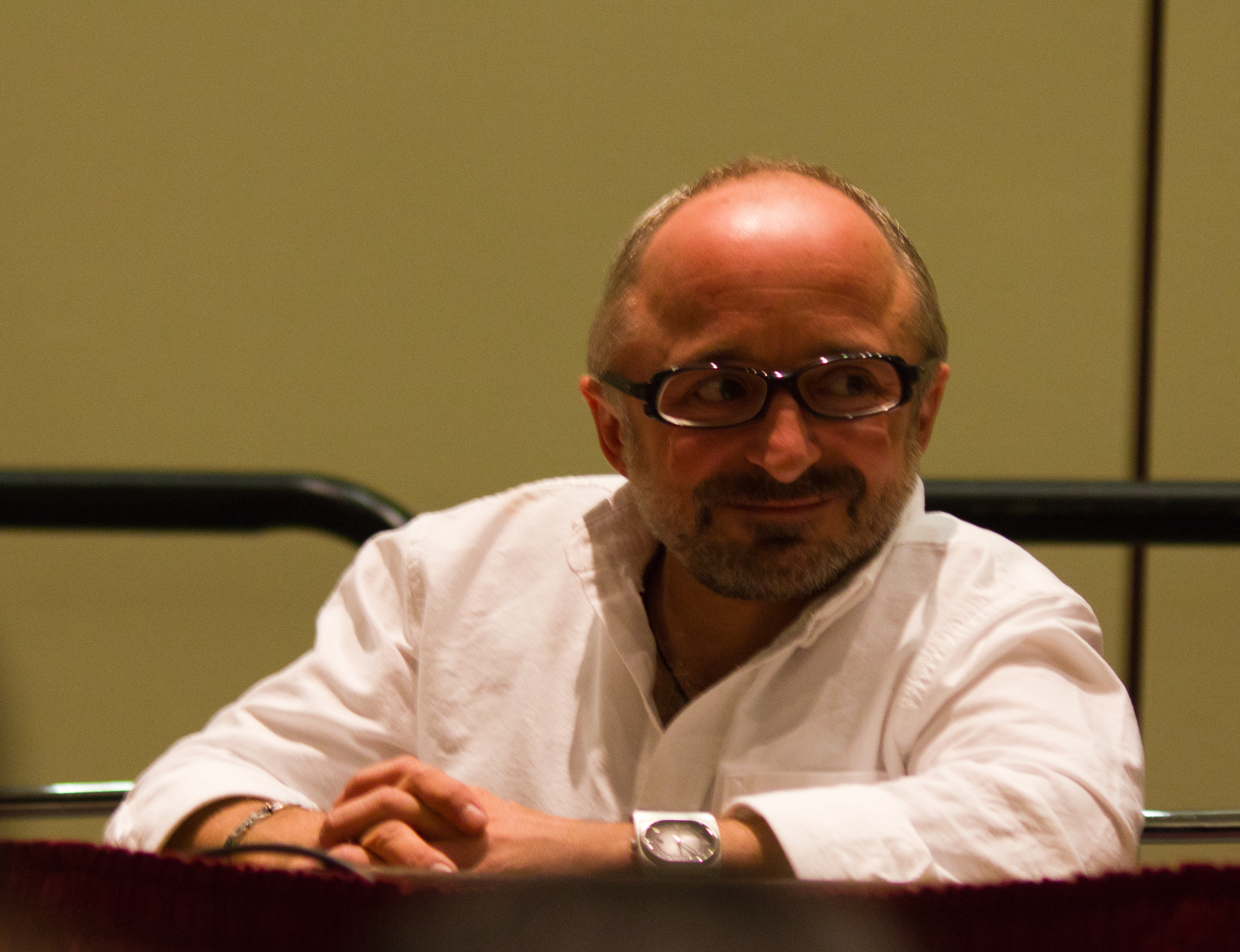
- Howland during a panel on Lost Girl at Fan Expo Canada in August 2011
- Other name: Richard
- Education: York University
- Occupations: Actor, musician
- Known for: Trick in Lost Girl

Richard "Rick" Howland is a Canadian actor known for his role as Trick on Lost Girl and Harry Buttman (a parody of Gary Bettman) in Bon Cop, Bad Cop.

== Career ==
Howland's first credited acting role appears in the feature film "To Catch A Yeti," opposite Meat Loaf. While at York University, he formed the comedy troupe the Four Strombones, which performed in comedy clubs around Toronto for more than a decade. A few of his roles have played off his 4 ft 7 in (1.40 m) stature. He has Osteogenesis Imperfecta.

He played Trick in Lost Girl, which aired for five seasons. Additionally, Howland played Harry Buttman in Bon Cop, Bad Cop, and Jayne Eastwood's son in Endless Grind. Howland has co-written a sitcom with Adam Nashman called Rick's Life, an industry based show that offers up the funny through Rick's own unique perspective; in addition to writing and directing his first short film, Underwritten, for the 48 Hour Film Festival.

Howland is also a songwriter, with two self-recorded albums available on iTunes.

== Filmography ==
- To Catch a Yeti (1995) – as Blubber
- The Cellar (1997) (short film) – as Zoltan
- The Adventures of Shirley Holmes (1998): Episode "The Case of the Bouncing Baby" – as Bernie Szabo
- John Woo's Once a Thief (1998): Episode "Shaken Not Stirred" – as Actor
- Traders (1999): Episode "The Last Good Deal" – as Rob 'Tiny' Lewis
- The Jesse Ventura Story (1999) – as Wrestler
- Sufferance (2000) (short film) – as The Butler
- Club Land (2001) – as Gump
- The Newsroom (2002): "Escape from the Newsroom" (TV Movie) – as Autograph Hound No. 2
- Sue Thomas: F.B.Eye (2004): Episode "Concrete Evidence" – as Sal Roland
- Short Tongue Freddy (2005) (short film) – as Freddy
- Crazy for Christmas (2005) – as Kenny
- Santa Baby (2006) (short film) – as Mr. Elf
- Bon Cop, Bad Cop (2006) – as Harry Buttman
- Citizen Duane (2006) – as Irate Pedestrian
- The Roommate (2007) – as Paul
- Tin Man (2007) (mini-series) – as Red Katt
- Billable Hours (2007): Episodes "The Sting" & "15 Minutes of Shame" – as Computer Tech
- Murdoch Mysteries (2008): Episode "Child's Play" – as Miles Gorman
- Billable Hours (2008): Episodes "Lil' War Photo" & "Shortstop" – as Keach
- Midgets Vs. Mascots (2009) – as Big Red Bush
- An Insignificant Man (2011) (short film) – as Hungover Clown
- Sanctuary (2011): Episode "Resistance" – as Galvo
- Lost Girl (2010–15) – as Trick; Main role
- Lost Girl Finale Pre-Show (2012) (Showcase TV special) – as self
- Top Chef Canada (2012): Episode "Lights, Camera, Action!" – as self
- Lost Girl ConFAEdential (2013) (Showcase TV special) – as self
- Prophecy (2013) (Lost Girl webisode) – as Trick
- Lost Girl: An Evening at the Clubhouse (2013) (Showcase TV special) – as self
- Killjoys (2016): Episode "How to Kill Friends and Influence People" - as Dej Serafan Archive Keeper
