= List of Lost Girl episodes =

Lost Girl is a Canadian supernatural drama television series that aired on Showcase for five seasons, from September 12, 2010, to October 25, 2015. It follows the life of a bisexual succubus named Bo, played by Anna Silk, as she learns to control her superhuman abilities, help those in need, and discover the truth about her origins.

The series was created by Michelle Lovretta and produced by Jay Firestone and Prodigy Pictures Inc., with the participation of the Canadian Television Fund (Canada Media Fund), and in association with Shaw Media.

Following good ratings and positive reviews, it was renewed for a second season on November 12, 2010 (two months after its premiere), and the episodes order afterwards increased to 22 episodes; a third season on December 9, 2011; a fourth season on February 28, 2013; and a fifth on February 27, 2014. On August 25, 2014, Showcase announced that the fifth season would be the last, with the original 13-episode order increased to 16 final episodes and the season divided into two parts.

In Australia, Lost Girl premiered on Sci Fi Australia on July 14, 2011. In the United Kingdom (UK and Ireland), it premiered on Syfy on September 1, 2011. In the United States, it premiered on Syfy on January 16, 2012, after Syfy purchased the rights to the first 26 episodes from Prodigy Pictures Inc. on May 18, 2011.

Total episode running time is 44:00 minutes, including opening title sequence and fade to black closing credits roll. Episodes broadcast on Syfy in the United States were 90 seconds shorter to allow for more commercial advertisement time. Starting with Season 3, 30 seconds that would have otherwise been cut from the Syfy episodes were preserved by substituting the original opening title sequence with opening credits superimposed over the first scene of each episode.

== Series overview ==
Season	Episodes		Originally released	
Season	Episodes		First released	Last released
1	13		September 12, 2010	December 12, 2010
2	22		September 4, 2011	April 1, 2012
3	13		January 6, 2013	April 14, 2013
4	13		November 10, 2013	February 16, 2014
5	16	8	December 7, 2014	January 25, 2015
5	16	8	September 6, 2015	October 25, 2015

== Episodes ==
=== Season 1 (2010) ===
No. overall	No. in season	Title	Directed by	Written by	Original release date
1	1	"It's a Fae, Fae, Fae, Fae World"	Érik Canuel	Michelle Lovretta	September 12, 2010
2	2	"Where There's a Will, There's a Fae"	Robert Lieberman	Peter Mohan	September 19, 2010
3	3	"Oh Kappa, My Kappa"	Paul Fox	Michelle Lovretta	September 26, 2010
4	4	"Faetal Attraction"	Steve DiMarco	Jeremy Boxen	October 3, 2010
5	5	"Dead Lucky"	John Fawcett	Emily Andras	October 17, 2010
6	6	"Food for Thought"	John Fawcett	Pamela Pinch	October 24, 2010
7	7	"ArachnoFaebia"	John Fawcett	Emily Andras	October 31, 2010
8	8	"Vexed"	John Fawcett	Michelle Lovretta	November 7, 2010
9	9	"Fae Day"	Steve DiMarco	Jeremy Boxen	November 14, 2010
10	10	"The Mourning After"	Paul Fox	Michelle Lovretta	November 21, 2010
11	11	"Faetal Justice"	Robert Lieberman	Peter Mohan	November 28, 2010
12	12	"(Dis)Members Only"	Steve DiMarco	Jeremy Boxen	December 5, 2010
13	13	"Blood Lines"	Robert Lieberman	Michelle Lovretta	December 12, 2010

=== Season 2 (2011–12) ===
No. overall	No. in season	Title	Directed by	Written by	Original release date	CAN viewers (millions) (Note: Canada ratings results)
14	1	"Something Wicked This Fae Comes"	Robert Lieberman	Michelle Lovretta	September 4, 2011	0.420
15	2	"I Fought the Fae (and the Fae Won)"	Steve DiMarco	Michelle Lovretta	September 11, 2011	0.358
16	3	"Scream a Little Dream"	George Mihalka	Jeremy Boxen	September 18, 2011	0.332
17	4	"Mirror, Mirror"	Steve DiMarco	Emily Andras	September 25, 2011	N/A
18	5	"BrotherFae of the Wolves"	Clark Johnson	Alexandra Zarowny	October 2, 2011	0.345
19	6	"It's Better to Burn Out Than Fae Away"	Gail Harvey	Steve Cochran	October 30, 2011	0.265
20	7	"Fae Gone Wild"	Lynne Stopkewich	Alexandra Zarowny	November 6, 2011	0.236
21	8	"Death Didn't Become Him"	Steve DiMarco	Steve Cochrane	November 13, 2011	N/A
22	9	"Original Skin"	Paul Fox	Emily Andras	November 20, 2011	0.285
23	10	"Raging Fae"	David Greene	Jeremy Boxen	November 27, 2011	0.223
24	11	"Can't See the Fae-Rest"	Gail Harvey	Shelley Scarrow	December 4, 2011	0.377
25	12	"Masks"	Lee Rose	Grant Rosenberg	December 11, 2011	N/A
26	13	"Barometz. Trick. Pressure."	Paolo Barzman	Steve Cochrane	December 18, 2011	0.308
27	14	"Midnight Lamp"	David Winning	Jeremy Boxen	January 22, 2012	0.330
28	15	"Table for Fae"	David Greene	Duana Taha	January 29, 2012	0.264
29	16	"School's Out"	James Dunnison	Jay Firestone & Harris Goldberg	February 12, 2012	N/A
30	17	"The Girl Who Fae'd With Fire"	Brett Sullivan	Emily Andras	February 19, 2012	0.232
31	18	"Fae-nted Love"	Michael DeCarlo	Shelley Scarrow	March 4, 2012	N/A
32	19	"Truth and Consequences"	Lee Rose	Grant Rosenberg	March 11, 2012	N/A
33	20	"Lachlan's Gambit"	Steve DiMarco	Steve Cochrane	March 18, 2012	0.264
34	21	"Into the Dark"	John Fawcett	Emily Andras	March 25, 2012	0.241
35	22	"Flesh and Blood"	Steve DiMarco	Alan McCullough	April 1, 2012	0.323

=== Season 3 (2013) ===
No. overall	No. in season	Title	Directed by	Written by	Original release date	CAN viewers (millions)
36	1	"Caged Fae"	Paolo Barzman	Emily Andras	January 6, 2013	N/A
37	2	"SubterrFaenean"	Steve DiMarco	Stephen Cochrane	January 13, 2013	N/A
38	3	"ConFaegion"	Paolo Barzman	James Thorpe	January 20, 2013	N/A
39	4	"Fae-de To Black"	Ron Murphy	Alexandra Zarowny	January 27, 2013	N/A
40	5	"Faes Wide Shut"	George Mihalka	Jeremy Boxen	February 10, 2013	N/A
41	6	"The Kenzi Scale"	David Greene	Sandra Chwialkowska	February 17, 2013	N/A
42	7	"There's Bo Place Like Home"	Gail Harvey	Brendon Yorke	March 3, 2013	N/A
43	8	"Fae-ge Against The Machine"	George Mihalka	Alexandra Zarowny	March 10, 2013	N/A
44	9	"Ceremony"	Lee Rose	James Thorpe	March 17, 2013	N/A
45	10	"Delinquents"	Gail Harvey	Michelle Lovretta	March 24, 2013	N/A
46	11	"Adventures In Fae-bysitting"	Lee Rose	Sandra Chwialkowska	March 31, 2013	N/A
47	12	"Hail, Hale"	Steve DiMarco	Stephen Cochrane	April 7, 2013	N/A
48	13	"Those Who Wander"	Ron Murphy	Emily Andras	April 14, 2013	0,269

=== Season 4 (2013–14) ===
No. overall	No. in season	Title	Directed by	Written by	Original release date
49	1	"In Memoriam"	Paolo Barzman	Emily Andras	November 10, 2013
50	2	"Sleeping Beauty School"	Steve DiMarco	Alexandra Zarowny	November 17, 2013
51	3	"Lovers. Apart."	Andy Mikita	Steve Cochrane	November 24, 2013
52	4	"Turn to Stone"	Paolo Barzman	Michael Grassi	December 1, 2013
53	5	"Let the Dark Times Roll"	Ron Murphy	Jeremy Boxen	December 8, 2013
54	6	"Of All the Gin Joints"	Mairzee Almas	Alex Zarowney	December 15, 2013
55	7	"La Fae Époque"	Steve DiMarco	Michael Grassi	December 22, 2013
56	8	"Groundhog Fae"	Ron Murphy	Emily Andras & Sam Ruano	December 29, 2013
57	9	"Destiny's Child"	Steve DiMarco	Steve Cochrane	January 12, 2014
58	10	"Waves"	Director X	Michael Grassi	January 19, 2014
59	11	"End Of A Line"	Ron Murphy	Steve Cochrane	January 26, 2014
60	12	"Origin"	Steve DiMarco	Alexandra Zarowny	February 9, 2014
61	13	"Dark Horse"	Ron Murphy	Emily Andras	February 16, 2014

=== Season 5 (2014–15) ===
No. overall	No. in season	Title	Directed by	Written by	Original release date
Part 1
62	1	"Like Hell Pt. 1"	Paolo Barzman	Michael Grassi	December 7, 2014
63	2	"Like Hell Pt. 2"	Paolo Barzman	Emily Andras	December 14, 2014
64	3	"Big in Japan"	Ron Murphy	Alexandra Zarowny	December 21, 2014
65	4	"When God Opens a Window"	Mairzee Almas	Steve Cochrane	December 28, 2014
66	5	"It's Your Lucky Fae"	Paolo Barzman	Ley Lukins	January 4, 2015
67	6	"Clear Eyes, Fae Hearts"	David Greene	Sandra Chwialkowska	January 11, 2015
68	7	"Here Comes the Night"	Paolo Barzman	Michael Grassi	January 18, 2015
69	8	"End of Faes"	Ron Murphy	Ley Lukins & Lauren Gosnell	January 25, 2015
Part 2
70	9	"44 Minutes to Save the World"	Gail Harvey	Sandra Chwialkowska	August 21, 2015 (online); September 6, 2015 (TV)
71	10	"Like Father, Like Daughter"	Paolo Barzman	Alexandra Zarowny	September 13, 2015
72	11	"Sweet Valkyrie High"	Bruce McDonald	Emily Andras	September 20, 2015
73	12	"Judgement Fae"	Lee Rose	Lara Azzopardi & Lauren Gosnell	September 27, 2015
74	13	"Family Portrait"	Ron Murphy	Michael Grassi	October 4, 2015
75	14	"Follow the Yellow Trick Road"	Paolo Barzman	Ley Lukins	October 11, 2015
76	15	"Let Them Burn"	Mairzee Almas	Sandra Chwialkowska	October 18, 2015
77	16	"Rise"	Paolo Barzman	Michael Grassi	October 25, 2015

== Motion comics ==
As part of the show's promotion, a series of motion comics, Lost Girl: The Interactive Motion Comic, was released on the official Lost Girl website. The first of these appeared on August 20, 2010. The plan was to release one chapter per month, for a total of six, during the Fall 2010 television season. Around the time of the release of No. 5, the individual chapters were made available for downloading as well as being watchable on the Lost Girl website. File formats included M4V, MP4 and WMV files. It used elements of traditional print comic books with animation and audio effects. Called a motion comic by the producers, it provided a story-telling medium which was hoped would provide information about Bo and other characters from the show, and give additional insight into the supernatural world of Lost Girl.

No.	Title	Directed by	Written by	Original release date
1	"Chapter 1: Feed"	Unknown	Navid Khavari	August 20, 2010
Bo struggles for survival and to discover her place in the world, while a mysterious force tracks her.
2	"Chapter 2: Leftovers"	Unknown	Navid Khavari	September 29, 2010
Detectives Dyson and Hale investigate the remains of a grisly murder and an even stranger set of suspects.
3	"Chapter 3: Futakuchi-onna"	Unknown	Navid Khavari	October 21, 2010
Bo reminisces on her first discovery of her ability, and chooses how to use it.
4	"Chapter 4: Dead Leads"	Unknown	Navid Khavari	November 20, 2010
Dyson and Hale continue their investigation, putting themselves in jeopardy.
5	"Chapter 5: Inhuman"	Unknown	Navid Khavari	January 14, 2011
Bo encounters an old foe under dangerous circumstances and is forced to make a difficult decision.
6	"Chapter 6: Reset"	Unknown	Navid Khavari	February 4, 2011
Dyson and Hale search for answers and get more than they bargained for.

== Webisodes ==
A series of four webisodes were created as a promotional lead-in to the premiere of Season Four on Showcase, with the first installment released on October 13, 2013.

No.	Title	Directed by	Written by	Original release date
1	"UPYURS6"	Paul Day	Alexandra Zarowny	October 13, 2013
Alongside Bruce, Kenzi seeks out the Druid Mossimo, when their travel is interrupted by an internet troll who denies passage across a bridge.
2	"Red Tape"	Paul Day	Michael Grassi	October 20, 2013
Vex runs into a few problems while trying to arrange a party.
3	"Getting to Know You: The Una Mens"	Steve Cochrane	Steve Cochrane	October 27, 2013
An old timey video introducing The Una Mens: a powerful group of Fae elders created after the disappearance of The Blood King who use lethal means to enforce the Blood Laws.
4	"Prophecy"	Paul Day	Sam Ruano	November 3, 2013
In The Dal Riata, Hale bets Trick that a Divination Plank is no better than a Magic 8 Ball, unwittingly becomes possessed, and delivers an ominous prophecy.
