= K. C. Collins =

Canadian actor

K.C. Collins
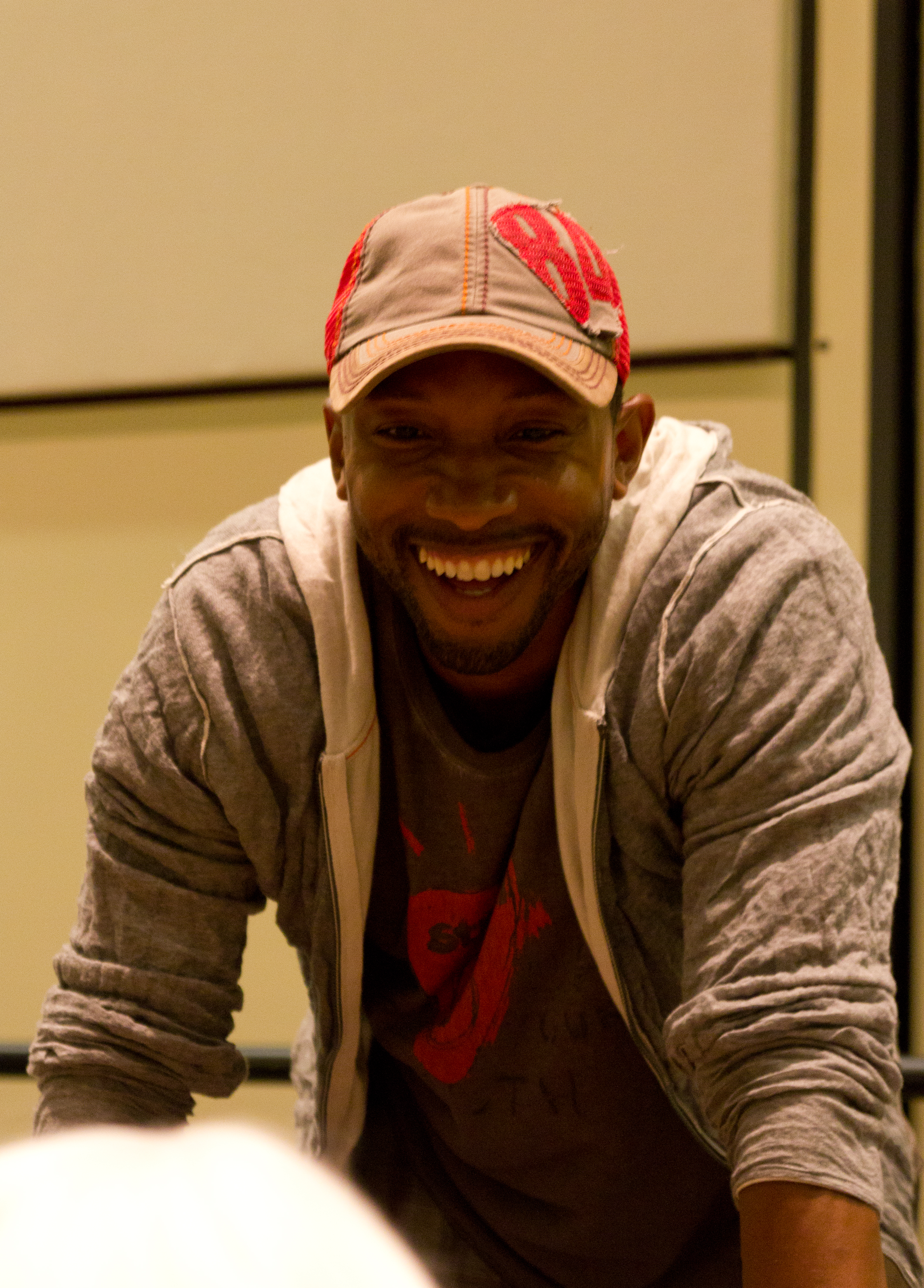
- Collins in August 2011
- Born: Kris Collins
- Other name: Chris Collins
- Years active: 1997–present

K.C. Collins, also known as Chris Collins, is a Canadian film, voice and television actor. He is best known for Hale on Lost Girl (2010–2014), and Dr. Tom Reycraft on Saving Hope (2012–2014).

== Early life ==
He attended Monroe Community College in Rochester, New York, on a baseball scholarship, choosing this rather than options of the University of Hawaiʻi and Florida State University to stay close to his grandmother who raised him from the age of 6. He left school to pursue an acting career.

== Career ==
Collins is best known for his roles as Hale on the Canadian television supernatural drama Lost Girl and Dr. Tom Reycraft on Saving Hope.

He received a Canadian Screen Award nomination for Best Supporting Performance in a Film at the 11th Canadian Screen Awards in 2023, for his performance as Keys in the film White Dog (Chien blanc).

== Filmography ==
=== Film ===
Year	Title	Role	Notes
1999	In Too Deep	Lookout	
2002	Paid in Full	Kid #1	
2003	Owning Mahowny	Bernie	
2003	Crime Spree	Lamar	
2003	Bulletproof Monk	Sax	
2003	Detention	"Hogie" Hogarth	
2007	Poor Boy's Game	Charles Carvery	
2008	Animal 2	James Jr.	
2008	Toronto Stories	Alton Morris	
2008	Saving God	Mike	
2014	RoboCop	Andre Daniels	
2019	Heroin	Trey	Direct-to-video
2021	Spiral	Detective Drury	
2022	Stellar	Dancer	
2022	White Dog	Keys	

=== Television ===
Year	Title	Role	Notes
1997	Due South	Jamal Martin	Episode: "Mountie and Soul"
1999	Love Songs	Tom "Tom-Tom"	TV movie
1999	Mean Streak	Runner	TV movie
1999	Exhibit A: Secrets of Forensic Science	Adrian Kinkead	Episode: "Stalker"
2000	The Hoop Life	Derek	Episode: "The Talented Tenth"
2000	Cheaters	Kid With Walkman	TV movie
2000	The Ride	College Kid #2	TV movie
2000	Seventeen Again	Leo	TV movie
2001	Ruby’s Bucket of Blood	Dugso	TV movie
2001	They Call Me Sirr	Damian	TV movie
2001	Earth: Final Conflict	R.J.	Episode: “Guilty Conscience”
2001	Doc	Billy	Episode: "The Art of Medicine"
2001	Blue Murder	Tyrone Beasley	Episode: “Remington Park”
2002	Sins of the Father	Youth	TV movie
2002	Our America	James	TV movie
2002	The Red Sneakers	Roscoe	TV movie
2002	Doc	Shawn Thomas	Episode: “Love of the Game”
2002	Whitewash: The Clarence Bradley Story	Danny Taylor	TV movie
2002	Odyssey 5	Chavo	Episode: “Time Out of Mind”
2002	Conviction	Bo	TV movie
2002	Blue Murder	Winston	Episode: "Payback"
2003
2003	Good Fences	Pee-Pie, Age 15	TV movie
2003	Sue Thomas: F.B.Eye	Antwan	Episode: "He Said She Said"
2003	Playmakers	Ron Martin	3 episodes
2003	Tarzan	Matt Flynn	Episode: "Secrets and Lies"
2003	Street Time	Rasheed	Episode: "Fly Girl"
2003	Missing	Dylan Hodder	Episode: "Victoria"
2003	Platinum	Walter	4 episodes
2004	Crown Heights	Bazel	TV movie
2004	Blue Murders	Eric Addell	Episode: “Blind Eye”
2004	The Wonderful World of Disney	Bobby	Episode: "Naughty or Nice"
2005	Blind Injustice	Esteban	TV movie
2005	Kojak	Jimmy Wiles	Episode: "Kind of Blue"
2006	Close to Home	Austin Jackson	Episode: "The Good Doctor"
2006	Doomstown	Kevin "Jeddi" Barrows	TV movie
2006	Lovebites	Brett	Unknown
2008	The Summit	Jale	2 episodes
2009	ZOS: Zone of Separation	Private Delmore	Miniseries
2009	Flashpoint	Derek Medeiros	Episode: "Exit Wounds"
2009	Guns	Derek Wilmot	2 episodes
2009	A Day in the Life	Jah	Film
2009–2010	Cra$h & Burn	Rollie Marks	Recurring (season 1)
2010	Rookie Blue	Benny	Episode: "Bullet Proof"
2010–2014	Lost Girl	William "Hale" Santiago	Main cast (seasons 1–4)
2011	In a Family Way	Sam	Direct-to-video
2012	The Listener	Kwesi Hanson	Episode: "The Taking"
2012–2014	Saving Hope	Dr. Tom Reycraft	Main cast (seasons 1–2); Recurring role (season 3)
2013	Alive	Lincoln	TV movie
2013	Lost Girl Webisodes	Hale	Episode: "Prophecy"
2013	OutsideIN	Markus	TV movie
2015	Single Ladies	Derek	2 episodes
2016	Mogadishu, Minnesota	Jamal	Unsold TV pilot
2016	Shoot the Messenger	Imam Kharri	Recurring (season 1)
2017	The Strain	Roman	Recurring (season 4)
2019	Ransom	NJay	Episode: "Justice"
2021	Clarice	Agent Garrett	5 episodes
2021	The Cleaning Lady	Tyler Jefferson	5 episodes
2022	Flying Tiger 3	Commander Collins	
2023–2024	Chucky	George "Coop" Cooper	8 episodes
2024–present	Law & Order Toronto: Criminal Intent	Theo Forrester	Main cast

=== Video games ===
Year	Title	Role	Notes
2018	Assassin’s Creed: Origins – The Hidden Ones		Voice
