= Lost Girl =

Canadian supernatural drama TV series (2010–2015)

- Lost Girl title card
- Genre: Supernatural; Drama; Fantasy
- Created by: Michelle Lovretta
- Developed by: Jay Firestone, Prodigy Pictures Inc.
- Starring: Anna Silk; Kris Holden-Ried; Ksenia Solo; K. C. Collins; Zoie Palmer; Rick Howland; Cle Bennett; Emmanuelle Vaugier; Rachel Skarsten
- Theme music composer: Jody Colero; Marco DiFelice; Benjamin Pinkerton
- Country of origin: Canada
- Original language: English
- No. of seasons: 5
- No. of episodes: 77 (list of episodes)

Production
- Executive producers: Jay Firestone; Paul Rapovski; Plato Fountidakis; Vanessa Piazza; Michelle Lovretta (Season 1); Peter Mohan (Season 1); Jeremy Boxen (Season 2); Grant Rosenberg (Season 2); Emily Andras (Season 3, 4); Michael Grassi (Season 5)
- Producers: Wanda Chaffey; Wendy Grean
- Running time: 44 minutes
- Production company: Prodigy Pictures Inc. in association with Shaw Media (Showcase)

Original release
- Network: Showcase
- Release: September 12, 2010 – October 25, 2015

Lost Girl is a Canadian supernatural drama television series that premiered on Showcase on September 12, 2010, and ran for five seasons. It follows the life of a succubus named Bo, played by Anna Silk, as she learns to control her superhuman abilities, help those in need, and discover the truth about her origins. The series was created by Michelle Lovretta and produced by Jay Firestone and Prodigy Pictures Inc., with the participation of the Canadian Television Fund (Canada Media Fund), and in association with Shaw Media.

Following good ratings and positive reviews, it was renewed for a second season on November 12, 2010 (two months after its premiere), with the episodes order afterwards increased to 22 episodes; a third season on December 9, 2011; a fourth season on February 28, 2013; and a fifth on February 27, 2014. On August 25, 2014, Showcase announced that the fifth season would be the last, with the original 13-episode order increased to 16 final episodes. The series' finale episode aired on October 25, 2015.

In Australia, Lost Girl premiered on Sci Fi Australia on July 14, 2011. In the United Kingdom and Ireland, it premiered on Syfy (UK) on September 1, 2011. In the United States, it premiered on Syfy on January 16, 2012.

== Introduction ==
Episodes begin with a cold open, followed by the opening title sequence crediting the top four main actors and series creator. The show title and credits are accompanied by the Lost Girl Theme song. Over the top of the sequence and theme song is the voice-over monologue by the protagonist, Bo (Anna Silk), summarizing her story:

Life is hard when you don't know who you are. It's harder when you don't know what you are. My love carries a death sentence. I was lost for years, searching while hiding; only to find that I belong to a world hidden from humans. I won't hide anymore. I will live the life I choose.

The Lost Girl Theme song was composed by Jody Colero, Marco DiFelice and Benjamin Pinkerton. Total episode running time is 44:00 minutes, including opening title sequence and closing credits roll. Episodes on Syfy in the United States are 90 seconds shorter to allow for more commercial advertisement time. Starting with Season 3, 30 seconds of story that would have otherwise been cut from the episodes for Syfy's advertising blocks were preserved by replacing the original opening title sequence with opening credits superimposed over the first scene of each episode.

== Plot ==
=== Season 1 (2010) ===
Bo is a Succubus who grew up in an adopted human family, unaware of her non-human nature and of the Fae world she descended from. She began to feel "different" when she entered puberty and didn't know she was not normal until she accidentally killed her high school boyfriend by draining his life energy during her first sexual encounter. When she told her parents what had happened, they broke the news to Bo that she had been adopted (see "Raging Fae"). Not knowing what she was and what she had done, Bo hated herself and ran away from home, exchanging her previous life for one without family or friends, moving from place to place and assuming a false identity whenever she killed again.

In the first episode, Bo saves a young human woman, Kenzi, from a rapist who had surreptitiously drugged her with a "roofie" in her drink. The two quickly become friends and Kenzi decides they should team up to create a Fae/Human detective agency. Confronted by the Fae leaders of the local territory with a demand for her to choose a side – either "Light" or "Dark" – Bo declares herself neutral, deciding instead to side with humans after Kenzi risks her life to find out where Bo had been taken by force and what they were doing to her.

Most of the Fae considered Bo an unknown entity that should either be eliminated as a risk to their secret existence or exploited for their benefit. Throughout the season, Bo learns more about the Fae world and herself while she searches for information about her origins. Along the way, Bo also develops romantic relationships with both Dyson, a Light Fae wolf shapeshifter and police detective; and Lauren, a human doctor and scientist in servitude to the Light Fae.

=== Season 2 (2011–12) ===
Bo faces personal challenges with Dyson after she finds out The Norn took his ability to feel passion for her in exchange for giving her the strength to defeat Aife in the season one finale; and with Lauren when their relationship became complicated after The Morrigan informed Bo in "It's Better to Burn Out Than Fae Away" that Lauren had a girlfriend. At the same time that she is coping with these turmoils, a villainous and evil ancient enemy of the Fae, the Garuda, is awakened and reappears with the intent to destroy the truce between Light and Dark Fae, and reignite the Great War between them. The new Ash, Lachlan, recruits Bo to be his champion in the battle against the Garuda and she agrees on the condition that he regard her as a partner, not as his servant. During this hectic time, Bo develops a no-strings-attached lustful relationship with Ryan Lambert, a Dark Fae Loki playboy that in "Fae-nted Love" became unwittingly thralled by her when, during energy-drawing healing sex, her blood came into contact with deep scratches she made on his back. Bo learns in "Into the Dark" that she is not only Trick's maternal granddaughter, but deduces that she has inherited some of his Blood Sage powers: if her blood comes into contact with someone's open wound, it can enslave and bind the recipient to her will (the same power that her mother, Aife, used to create male slaves). She uses her blood power to unite her team of Light and Dark in the final battle against the Garuda.

=== Season 3 (2013) ===
With Fae society in upheaval, Bo finds herself facing further changes and challenges as former ally Hale becomes the acting Ash – trying to forge a new balance between Light and Dark by appointing a Valkyrie aligned with the Dark Fae, Tamsin, as Dyson's new detective partner. Meantime, Tamsin is a secret agent working for two separate clients: The Morrigan, who wants to build a case against Bo so that she can execute her; and as a mercenary for someone who wants to entrap Bo. Matters become complicated when Kenzi is kidnapped by a crazed Kitsune who assumes her identity and deliberately sows distrust in the relationships between Bo and those closest to her, just as Bo must prepare for and go through an evolutionary Fae rite of passage that forces her to explore her past and future. Danger escalates when a human scientist convinces a despondent Lauren to join him in conducting scientific research in his private laboratory – all the while deceptively concealing his intent to harness Fae genetics for himself with the use of her expertise. The third season culminates with Bo being engulfed by black smoke and disappearing into thin air, presumably whisked away by her mysterious and powerful biological father (who may be "The Wanderer" that recurred throughout the season's story arc).

=== Season 4 (2013–14) ===
While Kenzi, Hale, and Dyson, are all living their lives, Bo is nowhere to be found. It's later realized that they simply forgot Bo, as someone was forcing them to. Massimo has been giving Kenzi temporary powers to appear Fae. Bo finally awakens to find herself on a train, and later jumps off. A group of Fae called the "Una Mens" are introduced. When she arrives home, it is discovered that while Bo herself did not consciously choose a side, her blood has chosen Dark. Tamsin is found reborn, as a little girl, and grows up with Kenzi as her pseudo-mom. Massimo steals from Bo and Kenzi in an attempt to convince Kenzi to pay him, and Bo figures out that he is not Fae, but human. He also kidnaps Tamsin to acquire her Valkyrie hair, and after being defeated by Bo, chases after the hair into a pit of lava, where at that point he is presumed to be dead. Many of Trick's secrets and past actions are revealed, including a tie to a past life of Tamsin's, and the fact that he used his blood to "erase" someone from existence. Tamsin discovers that by not taking the soul of a man named Rainer to Valhalla, she is part of the reason "The Wanderer" was created. Bo is able to get back on the train, where she finally meets Rainer, and brings him back to the Dal. Hale and Kenzi admit their feelings for each other. Lauren, who has been working with the Dark, somehow turns the Morrigan human. Kenzi's mother is introduced, and Hale attempts to propose. Massimo returns, and protecting Kenzi, Hale is killed. Kenzi tries to get revenge, but is stopped by Vex, who mentions that he is Massimo's guardian. Evony is revealed to be Massimo's mother, and gave him to Vex years ago when he was a boy. Bo learns that not only is her father coming, but that to close the portal, she will need to give her heart. That is revealed to be Kenzi.

== Cast and characters ==
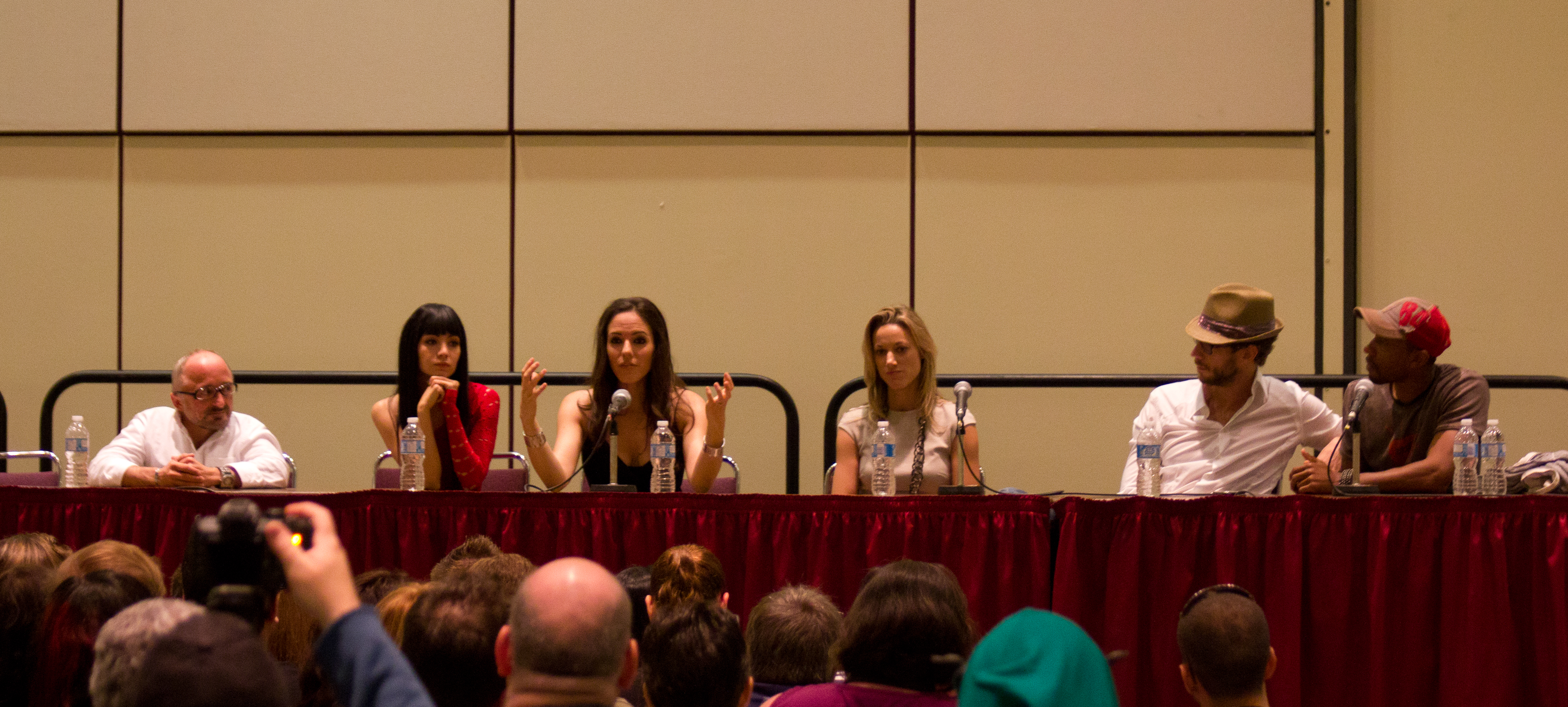
The cast in August 2011 at Fan Expo Canada. From left: Rick Howland, Ksenia Solo, Anna Silk, Zoie Palmer, Kris Holden-Ried, and K. C. Collins.

=== Main cast ===
- Anna Silk as Bo Dennis: A Succubus, she can seduce and manipulate both humans and Fae with the touch of her skin; and has the power to absorb the life force (the "chi", or Qi) of humans and Fae by drawing it out through their mouths. She feeds and heals from oral chi intake, and chi absorbed from the sexual energy created with males or females. At first she could not feed without killing her sexual partners; but with Lauren's help Bo learned to control her sexual drive and chi-drawing powers so that she could have sex with both Fae and humans without injuring or killing them. She can only go a few days without feeding before the hunger overcomes her. Although Fae are stronger than humans and can better endure her feeding on them, they are not immune from being drained and Bo can render them comatose or kill them. She is best friends with Kenzi and is romantically involved with both Lauren and Dyson. When Lauren's life is threatened in "Death Didn't Become Him", a strange and extremely powerful alternate persona emerged from her, which drained the chi from multiple individuals at a distance of several meters, and she declared, "I can be more powerful than all other Fae. Everyone will kneel at my feet. There will be no more Dark and no more Light. There will be only me". In the first season, Bo finally met her birth mother, Aife, who is also a succubus. Towards the end of the second season, she learned that Trick is her maternal grandfather and that she is named after her grandmother, Isabeau. In the third season, Bo willingly entered into a monogamous relationship for the first time in her life when she asked Lauren to be with her. In the season five finale, she is finally reunited with Lauren as a couple.
- Kris Holden-Ried as Dyson: A wolf-shapeshifter and homicide detective in the human police force. He is 1,500 years old, very strong, possesses a sharp sense of smell, and is acutely knowledgeable about Fae politics. A member of the Light Fae, his true allegiance is to Trick rather than to the Ash. He fell in love with Bo while under orders from Trick to keep an eye on her, and is best friends with Hale, his Light Fae detective partner. In the Season 1 finale, he involuntarily sacrificed his love for Bo when he offered his wolf to the Norn in return for her giving Bo the strength to defeat her murderous and maniacal mother, Aife; but the Norn – who demanded his wolf the first time he asked a favor from her in "Brother Fae of the Wolves" – realized that his wolf is no longer what he valued most and took his love for Bo and his ability to love anyone else again instead, leaving him with the memory of their relationship but unable to feel passion for her. He made efforts to remain friends with Bo, which was initially awkward when Bo couldn't understand why he was distant (until Bo came to terms with his detachment and declared to Kenzi in "Can't See the Fae-Rest" that her relationship with Dyson is over). After reuniting with his old love, Ciara, their relationship was hampered by Dyson's reluctance to reveal his encounter with the Norn and what he had lost in the exchange; however, he eventually admitted to her that he offered his wolf but it had cost him his ability to love anyone. This ability is restored by the Norn after Kenzi threatened to mutilate and cut down her Sacred Tree in "Into the Dark". Although the idea that a wolf mates for life was ascribed to his relationship with Bo, in "End of a Line", the voodoo witch Laveau told Dyson that his "prison" (i.e. his love for Bo) was of his own making. In Season 5, it is revealed that Dyson has a son named Mark.
- Ksenia Solo as Mackenzie "Kenzi" Malikov: a human and Bo's best friend and sidekick, declared as Bo's "property" and "pet" to allow her to participate in Fae society. She suggested Bo use her neutrality and bewitching powers to her advantage to become a private investigator, with her as partner. Kenzi ran away from home at a young age and lived on the streets and underground for a long time before meeting Bo. A small-time criminal, somewhat compulsive pickpocket, and scam artist with a long rap sheet, she can speak Russian fluently and possesses excellent street-smarts. She prefers to be underestimated at first glance and tends to put up a facade of generic sidekick cowardice, silliness, and uselessness for camouflage and to keep herself out of harm's way. Her plentiful extended family, all local diaspora, provide a steady stream of shady connections, sources, services, and other "favors". She has a vast wardrobe of clothing and wigs to change her appearance at will. Despite their differences, she and Bo quickly became close friends, with Bo choosing humanity rather than Fae in "It's a Fae, Fae, Fae, Fae World", after Kenzi risked her life to find out where Bo had been taken by Dyson and Hale, and called out to Bo to help her break out of a spell she had been put under during the trial to determine her alignment with either the Light or Dark clan. Kenzi and Hale became friends, with her frequently teasing or assisting him; and by the third season she had also endeared herself to Vex. Her character is the show's comic relief and primary source of its trademark banter; and her thieving is one of the most regularly used special skillsets in the show.
- Zoie Palmer as Dr. Lauren Lewis (a.k.a. Karen Beattie): A Human owned by the Ash as his property, she serves as a doctor and scientist for the Light Fae. She was seduced by Bo during their first meeting and hence fell in love with her. She has extensive knowledge of the different types of Fae and their abilities. In the first season, she helped Bo learn how to control her powers so that she could have sex with both Fae and humans without hurting or killing them. It is later revealed that she had a human girlfriend, Nadia, who had fallen into a coma five years earlier after contracting a mysterious virus while in the Congo with her. In exchange for her servitude, the Ash offered Lauren access to the Light Fae's laboratory and resources to find a cure for Nadia's condition. Lauren learned from Lachlan in "Masks", that she was tricked by the previous Ash; he ordered a Dark Fae Shaman to curse Nadia into a coma to ensure that Lauren would do everything in her power to find an antidote to the fever that was killing Fae and then pulled her into the Light clan's fold. After Bo (unbeknownst to Lauren) removed the curse, Lauren and Nadia reunited; but their relationship was soon shattered when it was revealed that Nadia had been infected by the Garuda, and he could control her mind and body. Bo was forced to kill Nadia when she threatened Lauren's life. In "Caged Fae", Bo asked Lauren to be with her in a committed relationship; however, disappointed and feeling inadequate in satisfying Bo's succubus nature, Lauren told Bo that she needed a "break" from the relationship. Lauren walked away from servitude to The Ash and protection by the Light Fae afterwards. In "Adventures In Fae-bysitting", a part of Lauren's past is disclosed and we learned that her real name is Karen Beattie and that she is a fugitive wanted by the International Criminal Offences and Criminal Intelligence Bureau. In "Turn to Stone", Lauren revealed that she had a brother, they had been inseparable and decided together "to change the world", but their cause had turned into blowing up pipelines. She knew how to build pipe bombs and made them for her brother to position; however, one location was supposed to have been deserted but wasn't and eleven people were killed in the explosion. This led to her going on the run, changing her identity, and keep running ever since (by the details in the ICOCIB wanted poster, the incident occurred in 1998, when Lauren was 17 or 18 years old. She is also fluent in Spanish, French and Swahili). In "Those Who Wander", Lauren sabotaged Dr. Isaac Taft's plan to extract Dyson's DNA and transfer the cells into him so as to become a Wolf-Shapeshifter and turned Taft into a human/Cabbit hybrid instead, making him an easy kill for Dyson. She went missing thereafter. In "Let the Dark Times Roll", Bo and Lauren were reunited at a Dark Fae party. Lauren told Bo that she had fled for her life after the Una Mens began to kill humans. The Dark Fae (i.e. the Morrigan) came looking for her, offering refuge, protection, and freedom to come and go as she pleased in exchange for working for the clan. They remained friends, putting behind them their previous tensions. In "End of Faes", Bo asked Lauren to be together again, as a couple. In the season five finale, she is reunited with Bo as a couple.
- Rick Howland as Fitzpatrick "Trick" McCorrigan: The Bartender and owner of the only Fae pub in town, the Dal Riata, which is neutral ground where members of the Light and Dark Fae clans, can freely socialize and find sanctuary. Trick is very powerful; he is a Blood Sage and can alter fate by writing it with his blood. Once known as the Blood King, he forced the truce, and wrote the decrees that ended the war between the Light and Dark Fae, and is on equal terms with the Fae Elders. Compared to other Fae who have contempt for humans, he is tolerant and often fond of humans, even trading away his most prized possession to help save Kenzi's life in "Food for Thought". He respects Lauren and when necessary seeks her opinion and expertise with matters involving Fae. Trick is extremely reluctant to use his blood powers as it can have unforeseen consequences: in "Blood Lines", his writing a culmination where Aife's maternal instincts emerged and stopped her from hurting and killing Bo not only left him weakened and wounded from the loss of blood, but in "Lachlan's Gambit" he told Lachlan that it had awakened the Garuda. Near the end of the second season, he revealed to Bo that he is her maternal grandfather.
- K. C. Collins as Hale Santiago: A Siren and Dyson's colleague as another Light Fae detective secretly working in the human police force. He can pacify, control, and kill humans and Fae alike with his whistling; in addition, he can cure pain and heal wounds with it. He is the son of the leader of one of the three most powerful and wealthiest Light Fae families, the Clan Zamora, but despite his family's social status he makes his own way in life, preferring to create his own connections and leverage (although he allows Bo and Kenzi to use his high-class social contacts when they need to infiltrate an upper-crust Fae event). Hale became good friends with Kenzi, with an undercurrent of mutual attraction gradually developing between them. He helped save Kenzi's life using his siren's whistle to cauterize her wound in the Season 2 finale. In the third season, he became the acting Ash after Lachlan's death. After proposing to Kenzi in "End Of A Line", Hale died protecting her from Massimo.

=== Recurring cast ===
- Cle Bennett as the Ash: leader of the Light Fae. He wants Bo to choose alignment with the Light, and orders Lauren to find a way to distract Bo so as to prevent her from attacking and killing Vex – which could have jeopardized the peace between the Fae clans and given the Morrigan a reason to execute Bo. He is badly injured in an assassination attempt by Bo's mother, Aife, and left in a comatose state on life support at the end of Season 1. (First appearance: "It's a Fae, Fae, Fae, Fae World"; Original Pilot, "Vexed"; Season 1)
- Emmanuelle Vaugier as Evony Fleurette Marquise: the Morrigan. A Leanan sídhe and the ruthless, cunning, and vengeful leader of the local Dark Fae, she can melt and dissolve flesh with her touch. She runs a talent agency in the human world where she represents young musicians and artists while feeding off their talents and stealing their lives in exchange for fame. (First appearance: "It's a Fae, Fae, Fae, Fae World"; Season 1, 2, 3, 4, 5)
- Aron Tager as Mayer: a Luck Fae. He is a bookmaker running a gambling business with both Fae and human clients. He was Bo's Dark Fae contact and told her where Vex could be found. His niece, Cassie, is an Oracle and in exchange for a favor allowed Bo to meet with her and reveal information about her birth mother. (First appearance: "Dead Lucky"; Original Pilot, "Vexed"; Season 1)
- Vanessa Matsui as Cassie: an Oracle. (First appearance: "Dead Lucky"; Season 1, 4, 5)
- Paul Amos as Vex: a Mesmer. A sadomasochist Dark Fae with a sarcastic and raunchy sense of humor, he can control people's bodies against their will, including forcing them to kill themselves or commit murder. Vex is a favorite of the Dark Elders and has a "like-hate" relationship with The Morrigan, serving as her hit man. He plays a pivotal role against the Garuda when Bo recruits him for her team and he uses his powers to delay the Garuda using Trick's blood to reverse the Blood Laws and reignite a war between Light and Dark. (First appearance: "Vexed"; Original Pilot, "Vexed"; Season 1, 2, 3, 4, 5)
- Inga Cadranel as Aife (a.k.a. Saskia in Season 1): a Succubus and Bo's birth mother. She is the daughter of Trick, the Blood King, and Isabeau. After rebelling against the truce imposed between the Light and Dark Fae and killing a Dark Elder, she is delivered to the Dark Fae for execution. Instead of being put to death, she endures many centuries of imprisonment, torture, and rape by a Dark King before she is able to escape. She masterminds a suicide bombing that kills most of the Light Fae Elders and critically injures the Ash. (First appearance: "The Mourning After"; Season 1, 3, 4, 5)
- Kate Trotter as the Norn: an Ancient with the power to grant one's strongest desire in exchange for that which they hold dearest. When Bo was fighting her mother, Aife, Dyson sought her intervention, for the second time in his life, and offered her his "wolf" in return for transferring his strength to Bo; but he did not realize that what he now valued most was his love for Bo, and The Norn took his ability to love her or anyone else, instead. (In "End Of A Line" the voodoo witch Laveau told Dyson that his love "prison" – i.e. his love for Bo – was of his own making) the Norn returned Dyson's love passion after Kenzi threatened to cut down her Sacred Tree with a chainsaw. (First appearance: "Blood Lines"; Season 1, 2)
- Hayley Nault as the Nain Rouge: a divine Fae spirit that likes to observe tragic events and materializes as a young girl. The Nain Rouge appears to Bo when unexplained Fae deaths begin to occur and gives Bo a vision wherein she is the cause of Trick's death. When the reemergence of the Fae's ancient enemy, the Garuda, begins to create strange events in nature, the Nain Rouge answers Bo's call to show herself and tells Bo that for her to defeat the Garuda she needs to build a united team of Light and Dark Fae. (First appearance: "Something Wicked This Fae Comes"; Season 2)
- Vincent Walsh as Lachlan: the second Ash. A Nāga, he wins the position of The Ash in a stag hunt after the previous Ash is left comatose. He is a stickler for rules and a commanding leader who does not hesitate to assert his authority, punish insubordination, and do away with anyone who threatens the Light Fae and the secret existence of the Fae. The Nāga has the power to kill the Garuda with its venom; but after losing his other heads violently for their toxin, Lachlan knows he cannot defeat his ancient enemy and before facing him in a fight to the death he has Lauren draw his venom so that she can turn it into a weapon for Bo to kill the Garuda with. (First appearance: "I Fought the Fae (and the Fae Won)"; Season 2)
- Lina Roessler as Ciara: a Fairy-Scuffock hybrid. The warrior daughter of a Fairy father and a Scáthach mother with powers of lightning-fast velocity, she taught the art of war to Dyson and his wolf-shapeshifter pack. Referred to as a Fairy Queen by Trick and Bo. She is a past love of Dyson, and they are reunited after the passage of centuries and become romantically involved; but although she is in love with Dyson, he is unable to respond in kind since the Norn has taken his ability to love. While she is initially treated frostily by Bo and Kenzi, Bo eventually comes to consider her a friend. She is killed by the Garuda when she shifts in front of Bo to protect her from the thrust of his sword. (First appearance: "BrotherFae of the Wolves"; Season 2)
- Athena Karkanis as Nadia: Lauren's human girlfriend. She accompanied Lauren to the Congo as a photographer and while there The Ash caused her to be stricken by a mysterious illness that leaves her in a coma – thereby manipulating Lauren into pledged servitude to him and the Light Fae. Bo is forced to kill her when she becomes possessed by the Garuda and attacks Lauren, threatening her life. (First appearance: "Masks"; Season 2)
- Aaron Ashmore as Nate: Kenzi's human boyfriend. Kenzi and Nate used to be neighbours when she was six years old and they meet again by coincidence sixteen years later when he answered an ad for a musician gig at Bo's surprise birthday party. Kenzi broke up with him when the Garuda's threat was most imminent and could have endangered his life, and she was also worried that The Morrigan would steal Nate's life after she offered to be his talent agent. (First appearance: "Masks"; Season 2)
- Anthony Lemke as Ryan Lambert: a Dark Fae Loki. He is a wealthy playboy who amassed a fortune as an inventor, alchemist, and supplier of rare and costly items. He crashes Bo's birthday party to give her an engraved bracelet that, she later learns, can protect her from a species of Fae. After Bo's relationship with Dyson ends and her romance with Lauren is interrupted when Nadia is released from her coma, she and Ryan become lustful lovers without her knowing that he is Dark, and he lets her feed off him. (First appearance: "Masks"; Season 2)
- Raoul Trujillo as the Garuda: an ancient and fiendish powerful enemy of the Fae. The Garuda transforms into a gigantic fiery eagle, and can possess and control its victims. Its source of food is anger and rage, and can only be killed with the venom of a Nāga. When the Blood King (Trick) writes the truce and Blood Laws that ended the Great War between Light and Dark, the Garudas dwindle as they starve to death until only one is left, remaining dormant for eons. When Trick uses his blood powers to stop Aife from hurting and killing Bo, it revives the Garuda, which then comes in search of Trick to force him into using his blood to repeal the Laws and reignite the war between Light and Dark. He is killed by Bo with Lachlan's venom. (First appearance: "Barometz. Trick. Pressure."; Season 2)
- Rachel Skarsten as Tamsin: a Valkyrie. Dyson's new detective partner after Hale became the acting Ash. A mercenary and bounty hunter aligned with the Dark Fae, she is not pleased with being forced to work with a Light Fae partner. She is building a case against Bo for attacking and feeding on a member of the Dark Fae, and rendering him unconscious. Initially, she has no problem showing her distaste for Bo or Dyson's infatuation with her, but develops an attraction and respect for Bo, to the point of questioning her own loyalties. (First appearance: "SubterrFaenean"; Season 3, 4, 5)
- Rob Archer as Bruce: a bodyguard and hatchet man for The Morrigan (species unknown). (First appearance: "ConFaegion"; Season 3, 4, 5)
- Deborah Odell as Stella Nashira: a Lodestar. She is recruited by Trick to mentor Bo in her preparation for the tests she has to face during The Dawning. She and Trick fall in love and leave together for Scotland in the season finale. In the pre-Season 4 webisode "Prophecy", Trick explained to Hale that he and Stella had ended their relationship. (First appearance: "There's Bo Place Like Home"; Season 3)
- Shawn Doyle as Dr. Isaac Taft: a psychotic human scientist and Fae hunter. He appears at Lauren's apartment delivering a research award after she fails to attend the special presentation ceremony. Dr. Taft deceptively courts Lauren until, after several failed attempts, he convinced her to join him in performing cutting edge medical research in his private laboratory. He knows about the Fae and Lauren's involvement with the supernatural race, and wants her expertise about them to inflict cruel revenge against the Fae after his brother was beheaded by one and he was blamed for the crime. Taft kidnaps Dyson to extract his DNA for use on himself, but Lauren secretly sabotages the DNA transplant and turns him into a human-Cabbit hybrid. He is killed and eaten by Dyson. (First appearance: "Fae-ge Against The Machine"; Season 3)
- Tim Rozon as Massimo: the Druid. Massimo's mother is Evony Fleurette Marquise (The Morrigan), who gave birth to him in the 1980s but then abandoned him and ordered Vex to raise him. (First appearance: "Hail, Hale"; Season 3, 4)
- Mia Kirshner as Clio: an Elemental Nymph. Clio had the ability to commune with all four elements of nature - Earth, Wind, Fire and Water. She helped Dyson transverse the intersecting planes of existence, which made it possible for them to get on and off the Death Train. (First appearance: "In Memoriam"; Season 4)
- Christine Horne as the Keeper: the inquisitor of The Una Mens. (First appearance: "Sleeping Beauty School"; Season 4)
- Ali Liebert as Crystal: a waitress at the diner Lauren worked in while in hiding. The two started to develop a bond until Crystal had sex with Lauren after the Fae coerced her to do it so as to gain her trust, and thereafter kidnap Lauren. They were both chained and locked up in a cell together. (First appearance: "Sleeping Beauty School"; Season 4)
- Linzee Barclay as the Handmaiden: a rebel fae who was an assistant to The Wanderer/Rainer, both trapped on the Death Train. She is responsible for selecting Bo to be transported to the Death Train in order to meet Rainer in hopes of breaking his curse. (First appearance: "Sleeping Beauty School"; Season 4)
- Kyle Schmid as Rainer/Wanderer: a rebel Fae who defied the Blood King and the Blood Laws created after the King ended the Great War between Fae clans. (First appearance: "Destiny's Child"; Season 4)
- Amanda Walsh as Zee: a.k.a. Zeus, an Ancient. Appeared in corporeal form by taking possession of the body of human Elizabeth Helm (First appearance: "Like Hell Pt. 2"; Season 5)
- Luke Bilyk as Mark: a Shapeshifter and son of Dyson. (First appearance: "When God Opens a Window"; Season 5)
- Noam Jenkins as Heratio: an Ancient, and a.k.a. Hera. Appeared in corporeal form by taking possession of the body of human Kevin Brown. (First appearance: "It's Your Lucky Fae"; Season 5)
- Shanice Banton as Iris: an Ancient, and a.k.a. Nyx. Appeared in corporeal form by taking possession of the body of human Cecilia Lawrence. (First appearance: "It's Your Lucky Fae"; Season 5)
- Lisa Marcos as Alicia Welles: a human. (First appearance: "Clear Eyes, Fae Hearts"; Season 5)
- Eric Roberts as Hades: an Ancient and King of the Underworld, Tartarus, and Bo's father. Called himself Jack (in other words, Jack-in-the-box). (First appearance: "End of Faes"; Season 5)

== Development and production ==
On October 16, 2008, Canwest (Canwest Global Communications Corp.) announced that it had commissioned a pilot for Lost Girl from Prodigy Pictures. The script was to be written by Michelle Lovretta, who had previously been a writer for the Canadian television series Mutant X. Principal photography was completed in February 2009.

Canwest issued a press release on August 13, 2009, announcing that it had given the green-light for 13 episodes of Lost Girl to air on its specialty channel Showcase: "A drama loaded with mystery, romance and intrigue, Lost Girl focuses on the gorgeous and charismatic Bo – a Succubus with heart. While Succubi are inhuman women who seduce and feed off their human partner's sexual energy, Bo is not your average Succubus. Raised in secret by humans, Bo tries to survive in the human, modern world without giving in to her instinctive urge to kill. Refusing to embrace her supernatural clan and its strict regimes, Bo uses her feminine wiles – along with some help from her friends – to fight for the underdog. All the while, she is on a very personal mission to unlock the secrets of her origin and find her birth mother...Leading the Lost Girl cast is Anna Silk (Billable Hours, Being Erica) as Bo. The gang of monster misfits and human helpers includes Kristen Holden-Reid (The Tudors) as Dyson, an inhuman cop involved in a love/hate relationship with Bo – he absolutely hates how much he loves her. Two-time Gemini Award winner Ksenia Solo (Renegadepress.com) stars as Kenzie, Bo's street-smart and fiercely loyal human best friend. The cast also includes Rick Howland (Bon Cop, Bad Cop) as Trick, a friendly saloon keeper with something to hide...Lost Girl will also offer a cross platform experience to viewers. Production is currently underway on the development of an interactive website, graphic novel and downloadable video game."

=== Season 1 ===
On April 6, 2010, Prodigy Pictures reported that principal photography had begun with production scheduled to wrap in June 2010: "Filming will take place at a West Toronto soundstage and on location in the vicinities of Toronto and Hamilton, Ontario, until June 25, 2010. The series is set to air on Showcase in the fall...Lost Girl follows supernatural seductress Bo (Anna Silk), a Succubus who feeds on the sexual energy of mortals...Bo's succubus nature tangles her in a sexy, romantic love-triangle with Dyson (Kris Holden-Reid), a shape-shifting Fae and homicide detective, and Lauren (Zoie Palmer), a human doctor who has found a way through science to help give Bo the sexual self-control she's been aching for. Navigating this complicated life with Bo is her human confidante and street-smart survivor, Kenzi (Ksenia Solo)...Writers include Michelle Lovretta; Peter Mohan; Jeremy Boxen; Emily Andras; and Pamela Pinch...A companion website for the series is being produced concurrently and will launch with the show to give viewers an unprecedented, interactive experience." The series was aimed for a Fall release date.

On June 22, 2010, Keyframe Digital Productions reported that they had been given the contract for visual effects on the first thirteen episodes of Lost Girl.

As part of the promotion of the series, an official site was opened at the beginning of August 2010 at www.lostgirlseries.com. It contained a short trailer for the series and a summary of information on the show and its characters. On August 20, 2010, "Lost Girl: The Interactive Motion Comic" was released as a lead-in to the series. On the same date, a press release indicated that Lost Girl cast and crew would be making an appearance at Fan Expo Canada in Toronto on August 27–29, 2010, where they would be answering questions about the show and have promotional items available for audience members as well.

Lost Girl premiered on Showcase on September 12, 2010. The show's debut became "the highest-rated Canadian scripted series premiere of all time on Showcase."

The first-season episode "Vexed" (1.08) is the original pilot shown to Showcase to obtain the green-light for the series.

=== Season 2 ===
Showcase renewed Lost Girl for a second season on November 12, 2010, announcing "record-breaking ratings" and the "number one scripted series for Adults 25–54 across all specialty channels" in Canada.

Production on thirteen episodes for Season 2 began on May 17, 2011, with filming taking place at a Toronto soundstage and at locations in and around the city until September 22, for a targeted Fall 2011 premiere.

On May 18, 2011, Syfy (U.S.) announced that it had acquired 26 episodes (Season 1 and Season 2) of Lost Girl from Prodigy Pictures.

Showcase announced in a July 7, 2011, press release that the Season 2 premiere would be on September 4, 2011, and that an additional nine episodes had been ordered to make the season a total of 22 episodes. The order for more episodes was made public two weeks before the first appearance of Lost Girl cast and producers at San Diego Comic-Con.

=== Season 3 ===
Naming Lost Girl its "highest rated drama series", Showcase announced the renewal for a third season on December 9, 2011, with production beginning in spring 2012.

The United States debut of Lost Girl on January 16, 2012, was announced by Syfy on December 12, 2011; with the last episode of Season 1 (1.13) on April 9 followed by Season 2 (2.01) on April 16, 2012.

Prodigy Pictures announced the start of principal photography on Season 3 on April 17, 2012, with the season premiere slated for fall 2012.

On July 12, 2012, Showcase declared via Twitter that Season 3 would premiere in winter 2013 (i.e. early 2013).

Syfy confirmed the January 14, 2013, U.S. premiere of Season 3 in a general press release on November 12, 2012. The following day (November 13), Showcase announced the Canadian premiere date of January 6, 2013.

=== Season 4 ===
Midway through Season 3, Showcase announced the renewal of Lost Girl for a fourth season on February 28, 2013, citing consistent delivery of "stellar ratings" and a "cornerstone series" for the network. Later on the same day, Syfy announced it had renewed Lost Girl for a fourth season containing thirteen episodes, and premiering in 2014.

On May 31, 2013, Prodigy Pictures and Showcase announced that filming had begun on thirteen episodes for Season 4, with an expected premiere in Fall 2013; followed with a start of production announcement by Syfy on June 4, 2013.

Showcase announced its 2013 Fall schedule on July 11, 2013, with Season 4 premiering on November 10, 2013, and its Sunday night broadcast changing from a 9 p.m. to 10 p.m. time slot.

As a lead-in to the premiere of Season 4, Showcase announced the streaming of a four-part original "webisodes" series on its Lost Girl website, with the first episode released on October 13, 2013.

On November 22, 2013, Syfy announced the January 13, 2014, premiere of Season 4, with the show's Monday broadcast schedule changed from 10 p.m. to 8 p.m.

Syfy announced on Twitter on January 23, 2014, that the series' broadcast was returning to 10 p.m. effective January 27, 2014 (episode "Lovers. Apart.").

=== Season 5 ===
Showcase and Shaw Media announced the renewal for a fifth season of Lost Girl on February 27, 2014. Vanessa Piazza, who joined Prodigy Pictures Inc. in 2009 as a producer, was elevated to the position of executive producer on the show. Michael Grassi, who became a writer and consulting producer for the series in its fourth season, moved into the position of showrunner and executive producer for Season 5.

On April 9, 2014, Prodigy Pictures and Showcase announced the start of production on 13 episodes, with filming taking place in and around Toronto, and Season 5 premiering in Fall 2014.

On August 25, 2014, Showcase and Anna Silk announced that Season 5 would be the series' last. The original 13-episode season was extended to 16 episodes and divided into Part 1 and Part 2, consisting of eight episodes each. Part 1 of the fifth season premiered on December 7, 2014. Part 2 (episodes 5.09-5.16) was scheduled for Fall 2015. On June 1, 2015, Showcase announced the airing of the final eight episodes starting on September 6.

On March 3, 2015, Syfy announced the United States premiere of Season 5 on April 17, 2015, at 10 p.m., with the show's broadcast day changed to Friday. Syfy changed the time slot to Thursday at 10 p.m. starting with episode "Clear Eyes, Fae Hearts". After the broadcast of the mid-season finale episode "End of Faes" on June 4, Syfy announced in a preview of Part 2 that Lost Girl would return in 2016.

In a pre-linear promotion of anticipated series, Showcase released the first episode of Part 2, "44 Minutes to Save the World", online on August 21, in advance of the broadcast premiere on September 6, 2015. It was made available for viewing on its website and on multi digital platforms.

=== Creator ===
In a 2011 interview for The Watercooler, Michelle Lovretta described her reaction to being asked to create Lost Girl:

When Prodigy (our studio) asked me to create a show about some kind of bisexual superhero who uses sex as part of her arsenal, my first thought was "hell, yes!"...The challenge was to create a fun, sex-positive world that celebrates provocative cheesecake for everyone, without falling into base stereotypes or misogynistic (or misandristic) exploitation along the way...Bo has lots of sex, with men, women, humans, Fae, threesomes... and she's still our hero, still a good person worthy (and capable) of love, and that's a rare portrayal of female sexuality...It's also rare to have a female lead who is so honestly sexual, without judgment...I think the single element I will remain proudest of is just that we've been able to create and put out into the world a sex positive universe where a person's sexual orientation is unapologetically present and yet neither defines them as a character, nor the show as a whole...I felt it was crucial to also demonstrate that sex and romance aren't the only ways that Bo measures a relationship's worth, to give the show balance...Fans may have noticed that Kenzi clarified her hetero orientation at the end of ep 101...That line was necessary because...I was determined to protect their platonic-yet-epic BFF-ness, so I made sure it was written in as canon. Partly, this was to debunk the gay-panic cliche that bisexual people sexualize everyone, and are incapable of platonic friendship. But there was another, simpler and more personal reason: I think friendship is the fifth element...So, hidden in amongst all the romance and cleavage and threesomes, the Lost Girl Bo and Kenzi relationship is my own little love poem to all the BFFs out there who do it right.

=== Showrunner ===
Series creator Michelle Lovretta teamed with industry veteran Peter Mohan to co-showrun Season 1. Lovretta and Mohan left (on good terms) after the first season to pursue other opportunities, and the Season 2 showrunner role was split between Lost Girl writer Jeremy Boxen and another industry veteran, Grant Rosenberg.

Emily Andras, who had been involved with the series as a writer and consulting producer since Season 1, became showrunner effective Season 3. In an interview for The Huffington Post after the announcement by Syfy that it had renewed the show for a third season, Andras described what direction she would like to see Lost Girl go in the future:

Into a world where a bisexual protagonist is non-news. I'm so proud of the comedic ambitions of Lost Girl, that it's dedicated genre [fare] that doesn't take itself too seriously, but I also love exploring the shades of gray; the moral ambiguity of characters who may live forever and their relationships with mortals who will not.

In a December 2012 interview with the Writers Guild of Canada, Andras detailed the flow of the Lost Girl showrunner title, followed with a second interview in the guild's magazine, Canadian Screenwriter. In an interview with SpoilerTV, she addressed the fervor of the show's fandom. On March 10, 2013, after the Showcase broadcast of Fae-ge Against The Machine, Emily Andras participated in a special live question and answer session on Doccubus.com with fans of the show and of Bo & Lauren. In the Q&A, Andras also discussed the selection of Zoie Palmer for the role of Dr. Lauren Lewis, the theme of death, and the love triangle between "the wolf" and "the doctor". Starting with the premiere episode of Season 4, In Memoriam, Andras held a series of exclusive post-episode weekly interviews with The Loop (TV Guide.CA). She discussed the process of writing Lost Girl and her involvement with the series in an interview with the popular podcast fan site, Drinks at The Dal.

Michael Grassi, who joined the show as a writer and consulting producer for the fourth season, succeeded Emily Andras as showrunner for Season 5. (Andras moved into the position of executive consulting producer on the series.)

=== Filming locations ===
Most of the interior settings were filmed at Revival 629 Studio located at 629 Eastern Ave, Toronto, Ontario, Canada.

1. The exterior of Bo and Kenzi's home, known as "The Clubhouse", is located at 154 Villiers St., Toronto, Ontario, Canada.
2. The "Glass Factory" from episode one is the Essroc Toronto Terminal cement silo located at 304 Cherry St., Toronto, Ontario, Canada.
3. The exterior of the "Carpe Noctem" club is located at 507 King St E, Toronto, Ontario, Canada.
4. The original location of "The Dal Riata" bar was the second floor of Slainte Irish Pub at 33 Bowen St., Hamilton, Ontario, Canada. The location was later recreated on a sound stage at Revival Studios. The Slainte is currently closed.
5. The exterior of Dyson and Hale's police station, the "39th Division", is The Hamilton Go Centre at 36 Hunter St. E, Hamilton, Ontario, Canada.
6. The "Light Fae Headquarters" for Lauren and The Ash is the Pigott Building at 36 James Street South, Hamilton, Ontario, Canada.
7. The "Queensdale Country Club" is a private residence located at 255 Inglewood Drive, Port Credit, Ontario, Canada.

== Sexuality ==
The sexuality presented in Lost Girl is an important element of the show's narrative. The lead character, Bo, is a bisexual succubus that survives, thrives, and heals by feeding on the chi (life force) of male and female humans, and Fae — either by drawing it out through their mouths, or by absorbing the energy created from sexual contact with them. Casual sex is intrinsic and depictions of sexual encounters have also included threesomes.

Throughout the series, Bo has two primary romantic relationships: Dyson, a heterosexual shapeshifter Light Fae that transforms from wolf to human-like form; and Lauren, a lesbian human doctor and medical researcher who is a pledged servant of the leader of the Light clan. The relationships of Bo with Dyson and Bo with Lauren is referred to as the "Love Triangle".

As a succubus, however, Bo is unable to prevent the fundamental requirements of her nature from hindering emotional want. In Season 3, Bo asked Lauren to join her in a physically monogamous relationship, but her feeding needs ultimately made it unsustainable.

Other main characters in Lost Girl are heterosexual (Kenzi, Trick, Hale), while the sexual range of recurring characters varies. For example, the leader of the Dark Fae clan, The Morrigan, was seduced by Bo in Season 2, and Lauren in Season 4; the Dark mesmer, Vex, was shown initially as a BDSM submissive with a dominatrix and the first explicitly sexual disclosure about him was in a bisexual fantasy in Season 5. The Dark valkyrie, Tamsin, seduced Dyson in Season 4; and in Season 5 offered Bo her random one-night stand male after she had sex with him, followed by her commencing a sexual affair with Bo.

In the Lost Girl universe, sexuality is a natural, judgement-free affirmation of life. The sex-positive series has been praised by critics and fans for its seamless portrayal of amorous desire and groundbreaking representation of bisexuality — and for not labeling sexual orientations shown in episodes as straight, bisexual, lesbian, or gay.

In an interview with GayCalgary Magazine, Rachel Skarsten expressed what distinguished Lost Girl in its treatment of romantic relations:

One of the things we pride ourselves in with Lost Girl is, it's not about this heterosexual couple, this homosexual couple – it's just about the relationship; about two people who love each other, and I think that is one of the things that makes our show really special.

A character's sexual identity in Lost Girl is precisely what audiences see without needing explanations in the storyline.

== Episodes ==
Season	Episodes		Originally released	
Season	Episodes		First released	Last released
1	13		September 12, 2010	December 12, 2010
2	22		September 4, 2011	April 1, 2012
3	13		January 6, 2013	April 14, 2013
4	13		November 10, 2013	February 16, 2014
5	16	8	December 7, 2014	January 25, 2015
5	16	8	September 6, 2015	October 25, 2015

== Broadcast ==
The series premiered in Australia on July 14, 2011, on Sci Fi, with Season 2 returning on February 23, 2012, and Season 3 on SF (formerly Sci Fi) on January 10, 2013. After SF ceased operations in December 2013, Lost Girl was left without a premiere network in Australia. Free-to-air network SBS2 thereafter acquired the rights to Seasons 1-3 of the series. Season 1 aired on October 1, 2013; Season 2 on September 29, 2014. (Season 3 has not aired as of this writing.) In 2015, Stan, a new streaming service, offered Season 4 in its entirety at its launch on January 25, 2015, and later premiered the first half of Season 5 on February 28, 2015, and the second half of Season 5 on September 7, 2015.

In the United Kingdom and Ireland, the series premiered on Syfy (UK) on September 1, 2011, and returned for Season 2 on January 12, 2012, followed by Season 3 on April 23, 2013, and Season 4 on January 16, 2014. Due to a drop in ratings, the series was moved from 10 p.m. to 9 p.m. effective February 5, 2014.

The series premiered on Syfy in the United States on January 16, 2012, after Syfy purchased the rights to Seasons 1 and 2 from Prodigy Pictures on May 18, 2011. Syfy aired both seasons back-to-back, with Season 1 ending on April 9, 2012, and Season 2 starting on April 16, 2012. Season 3 premiered on January 14, 2013. Season 4 premiered on January 13, 2014, with the time slot changed from its normal 10 p.m. schedule to 8 p.m., but returned to 10 p.m. on January 27, 2014, with "Lovers. Apart.".

=== Broadcast special ===
The finale of Season 2 on April 1, 2012, was preceded by the Showcase special, Lost Girl Finale Pre-Show. Filmed on the series' "Dal Riata" set, the live audience one-hour program hosted by Lost Girl writer Steve Cochrane featured behind-the-scenes footage and interviews with Anna Silk, Kris Holden-Ried, Ksenia Solo, Zoie Palmer, Rick Howland, K.C. Collins, Paul Amos, and executive producer Jay Firestone.

Lost Girl ConFAEdential, a special roundtable discussion about the previous two seasons and characters, aired on Showcase before the premiere of Season 3 on January 6, 2013. Moderated by Jay Firestone, Executive Producer of Lost Girl, it featured (in order of introduction): Rick Howland ("Trick"), Zoie Palmer ("Dr. Lauren Lewis"), Anna Silk ("Bo"), Kris Holden-Ried ("Dyson"), Ksenia Solo ("Kenzi"), and K.C. Collins ("Hale").

The premiere of Season 4 was preceded by Lost Girl: An Evening at the Clubhouse, a one-hour special featuring cast-on-cast interviews, webisode footage and a sneak peek. During the pre-show, cast reflected on both the past and upcoming seasons, revealed behind-the-scenes stories, and responded to fan questions.

== Webisodes ==
A series of four webisodes streamed on the Showcase website were created as a promotional lead-in to the premiere of Season 4 in Canada, with the first installment released on October 13, 2013.

== Home media and digital distribution ==
On October 12, 2011, Prodigy Pictures and Showcase announced on the show's official Facebook page that episodes of Lost Girl had become available for purchase and download from iTunes Canada. Episodes later became available on iTunes U.S., Netflix, and for streaming or purchase from Amazon Prime Video. The series ended its run on Netflix in 2020.

In Canada (Region 1), Entertainment One, Ltd. released the DVD of Season 1 on April 24, 2012. On November 13, 2012, Berkshire Axis Media released Season 2 in Canada on DVD and Blu-ray. Effective Season 3, the release of the DVD and Blu-ray in Canada was the same Region 1 discs released in the United States by Giant Ape Media, a subsidiary company of Funimation.

In Australia (Region 4), Sony Pictures Home Entertainment released Season 1 on DVD on November 23, 2011; Season 2 on September 19, 2013; and Season 3 on December 5, 2013.

In the United States (Region 1), Giant Ape Media (Funimation SC) released the uncut episodes "not seen on Syfy" on DVD and Blu-ray with Season 1 on October 23, 2012, followed by Season 2 on November 13, 2012. The DVD and Blu-ray of Season 3 was released by Giant Ape Media in Region 1 (Canada and U.S.) on November 19, 2013. The Season 4 DVD and Blu-ray for Region 1 (Canada and U.S.) was released by Giant Ape Media on June 24, 2014.

In the United Kingdom and Ireland (Region 2), Sony Pictures Home Entertainment released Season 1 on DVD on February 25, 2013; Season 2 on September 9, 2013; Season 3 on March 3, 2014; and Season 4 on May 19, 2014.

== Other media ==
As a promotional lead-in to the show's premiere, Lost Girl: The Interactive Motion Comic, a series of six motion comics, was released on Showcase's official Lost Girl website. The first chapter streamed on August 20, 2010. Around the time of the release of Chapter 5, the individual chapters were all made available for downloading as well as viewing on the website. File formats included M4V, MP4 and WMV files. The motion comics provided a story-telling medium that introduced Bo and some characters from the show, and gave additional insight into the supernatural world of Lost Girl.

To promote the show's United States premiere on Syfy in January 2012, a limited edition comic book, Lost Girl: Prologue, was distributed during the Lost Girl panel on July 22, 2011, at San Diego Comic-Con in 2011.

On April 14, 2013, Showcase released Lost Girl: The Game, a free interactive mobile game app for iOS and Android devices. The release of the game coincided with the Season 3 finale. Syfy launched the game on April 22, 2013, to correspond with the conclusion of the season in the United States.

=== Social media ===
On January 6, 2013, Showcase and Prodigy Pictures held the first Lost Girl live tweeting event during the broadcasts of the Lost Girl ConFAEdential pre-show special and the Season 3 premiere on Showcase, with Anna Silk, Ksenia Solo, Zoie Palmer, Rick Howland, and K.C. Collins.

The live tweeting event was repeated on January 14, 2013, during the American premiere of Season 3 on Syfy, with Anna Silk, Kris Holden-Ried, Ksenia Solo, Zoie Palmer, Rick Howland, K.C. Collins, and Paul Amos.

== Reception ==
Ratings for the 9 p.m. series premiere on September 12, 2010, was over "400,000 viewers (2+)" and "another 184,000 (2+)" for the episode rerun at 10:40 p.m., making Lost Girl the "highest-rated Canadian scripted series premiere of all time on Showcase."

In Canada, Rob Salem of the Toronto Star described the show as one that "definitely bears watching". Vladislav Tinchev, writer for the German site Serienjunkies wrote that the series would benefit from "revealing more background information about the represented world," rather than spend time on "clumsy action scenes". But Tinchev pointed out that "Lost Girl is not lost at all, and has immediately won the audience and entertains them well. And there is nothing wrong with that, because TV series need not be world-shaking events."

In anticipation of its United States premiere, Brian Lowry of Variety wrote: "At first glance, Lost Girl looks like another one of those Canadian imports picked up mostly for financial reasons. The pilot, however, proves unexpectedly fun—a sort of diluted version of True Blood... but the show has wit, style and an enticing lead in the leather-clad Anna Silk." Writing for The New York Times, Mike Hale said: "Like other fantasy-tinged shows on Syfy and USA, it offers the minor pleasures of formulaic fantasy and weekly puzzle solving, though in a cheaper-looking and less original package than usual...." In a post-premiere review for The Huffington Post, Mauren Ryan wrote: "No one can say there's been a dearth of genre-tinged programs on television in recent years. The vampire boom of the mid-aughts was followed by the zombie bonanza of the last couple of years; all in all, we're awash in various undead and otherworldly creatures...But one of the reasons Lost Girl has made such a big impression on me...is because the Syfy show does what so many genre programs fail to do these days: It has fun with its premise...But don't expect Lost Girl to be perfect: Bo's universe can seem constricted at times, the weekly clients and monsters aren't always interesting and occasionally the storytelling has abrupt moments. But my occasional complaints have been overwhelmed by my growing appreciation of what creator Michelle Lovretta has done with this light drama: She's created a Hero's Journey with a self-confident woman — a succubus, no less — at the center of it...Lovretta has done something subversively impressive with Lost Girl. She's built a whole show around the idea of a woman who is learning just how much she can or should take from others, and how much she can rely on herself."

The relationship between Bo and Lauren became popularly referred to as "Doccubus" after fans of the couple combined "Doctor" Lauren Lewis with Bo's "Succubus" species (i.e. Doc+cubus) to create the alias. The term was used with the show's publicity and by entertainment media and bloggers when referring to the pairing.

Episodes broadcast by Syfy in the United States have :90 seconds cut from their original 44:00 minutes to allow more time for commercial advertisements. In Season 2, the decision to edit an emotive scene between Bo and Lauren from "Scream a Little Dream" created controversy among LGBT fans of the show, resulting in the network being accused of insensitivity and censorship. Lost Girl producers responded to the backlash by issuing a public statement on the show's Facebook page explaining that the edits were done in-house, and not by Syfy, for "timing and not content." As noted by Dorothy Snarker writing for AfterEllen: "With so little representation of gay relationships on TV, every little touch matters." After this experience, beginning with Season 3, the original opening title sequence accompanied by the Lost Girl Theme song was replaced with opening credits superimposed over footage of the first scene, sparing :30 seconds from being cut from the episodes for Syfy (U.S.).

In a 2012 report by TiVo of television programs watched at bedtime, Lost Girl was rated one of the top ten, most watched shows.

In a Slate magazine 2012 year-end list of 15 favorite television shows that are a pleasure to watch, Lost Girl (on Syfy) was named "Number 1" on the list, and hailed as "Sexy, snarky, and Canadian."

"Bo and Lauren" was chosen Top TV Couple of 2013 by E! Online (E! Entertainment Television), with its competition in the annual popularity contest compared to a "David versus Goliath".

On February 14, 2013, a CNN (Cable News Network) segment of its 35 favorite television couples, past and present, named "Bo and Lauren" couple "Number 9" in the list.

"Lauren Lewis" was chosen "Number 1" by AfterEllen in its November 2013 survey of The Top 25 Lesbian/Bi Characters on TV (Right Now). "Bo" was named "Number 7" in the list.

In an exclusive selection of the best Canadian television shows of 2013, Lost Girl was rated "Number 6" by some of Canada's top critics and television editors in Canada's Best in Show by TV Guide (Canada).

Huffpost Canada ranked Lost Girl as the "Number 4" television show in its Best Canadian TV Of 2013.

In the annual AfterEllen Visibility Awards, Lost Girl, Lauren Lewis, and Zoie Palmer won the categories in which they were candidates for year 2013.

At the 2014 Canadian Screen Awards, Lost Girl won the Fan Choice Award for Favourite Canadian Show and Zoie Palmer won the Fan Choice Award for Favourite Canadian Screen Star. In 2015, Anna Silk received the Fan Choice Award for Favourite Canadian Screen Star by the Academy of Canadian Cinema & Television.

"Bo Dennis" was named "Number 92" in the list of the top 100 Best Sci-Fi Characters of All Time by the British Film Institute.

=== Awards and nominations ===
==== Canadian Screen Awards ====
Year	Category	Nominee	Result	Ref
2013	Best Production Design or Art Direction in a Fiction Program or Series	Ian Brock (for "Something Wicked This Fae Comes")	Nominated	
2013	Best Writing in a Dramatic Series	Emily Andras (for "Into the Dark")	Nominated	
2013	Best Achievement in Casting	Lisa Parasyn (for "Barometz. Trick. Pressure.")	Nominated	
2013	Best Performance by an Actress in a Featured Supporting Role in a Dramatic Program or Series	Ksenia Solo (for "The Girl Who Fae'd With Fire", "Truth and Consequences")	Nominated	
2015	Best Photography in a Dramatic Program or Series	Craig Wright (for "In Memoriam")	Nominated	
2015	Best Achievement in Casting	Lisa Parasyn, Jon Comerford (for "In Memoriam")	Nominated	
2015	Best Performance by an Actor in a Featured Supporting Role in a Dramatic Program or Series	Paul Amos (for "In Memoriam", "Origin")	Nominated	

==== Directors Guild of Canada ====
Year	Category	Nominee	Result	Ref
2011	Production Design – Television Series	Ian Brock (for "Vexed")	Nominated	
2011	Sound Editing – Television Series	Alex Bullick, James Robb, Tom Bjelic and John Laing (for "Dead Lucky")	Nominated	
2014	Best Sound Editing – Television Series	Tom Bjelic, Emile Boucek, Katrijn Halliday, John Laing and James Robb (for "Waves")	Nominated	

==== Gemini Awards ====
(Incorporated into Canadian Screen Awards as of 2013)

Year	Category	Nominee	Result	Ref
2011	Best Performance by an Actress in a Featured Supporting Role in a Dramatic Series	Ksenia Solo	Won	
2011	Best Cross-Platform Project – Fiction	Zandro Chan, Jay Firestone, Lui Francisco, Tigh Walker	Nominated	
2011	Best Writing in a Dramatic Series	Michelle Lovretta	Nominated	
2011	Best Photography in a Dramatic Program or Series	David Greene csc	Nominated	
2011	Best Achievement in Casting	Jon Comerford, Lisa Parasyn	Nominated	

==== Leo Awards ====
Year	Category	Nominee	Result	Ref
2013	Best Direction in a Dramatic Series	David Winning (for "Midnight Lamp")	Nominated	

==== WorldFest-Houston International Film Festival ====
Year	Category	Nominee	Result	Ref
2012	Television and Cable Production – Directing – Television	David Winning	Won	

=== Contests ===
Year	Category	Nominee	Result	Ref
2011	Best of TV Awards 2011 – Best Couple	Bo and Dr. Lauren Lewis	Won	
2012	Favorite TV Drama	Lost Girl	Won	
2012	Favorite TV Actress	Anna Silk	Won	
2013	Top TV Couple of 2013	Bo and Lauren	Won	
2013	Girl on Top 2013 (Favorite TV Leading Ladies)	Zoie Palmer	Won	
2013	2013 Golden Remote Awards – Best Couple	Bo and Lauren, Lost Girl	Won	
2013	Favorite TV Drama	Lost Girl	Won	
2013	Favorite TV Actress	Zoie Palmer	Won	
2013	Best Tweeter	Zoie Palmer	Won	
2013	Best of TV Awards 2013 – Best Couple	Dr. Lauren Lewis & Bo "Lost Girl"	Won	
2013	Best of TV Awards 2013 – Best Sci-Fi or Fantasy Actress	Zoie Palmer "Lost Girl"	Won	
2014	Canadian Screen Awards – Fan Choice Award for Favourite Canadian Show	Lost Girl	Won	
2014	Canadian Screen Awards – Fan Choice Award for Favourite Canadian Screen Star	Zoie Palmer	Won	
2015	Canadian Screen Awards – Fan Choice Award for Favourite Canadian Screen Star	Anna Silk	Won	

=== Visibility ===
Year	Category	Nominee	Result	Ref
2012	Hottest Hookup in Film/TV	Bo and Lauren (Lost Girl)	Won	
2012	Favorite Fictional Lesbian Couple	Bo and Lauren (Lost Girl)	Won	
2013	Best Lesbian/Bi Character Ever	Lauren Lewis (Lost Girl)	Won	
2013	Favorite Lesbian/Bi Character	Lauren Lewis, Lost Girl	Won	
2013	Favorite Fictional Lesbian Couple	Bo and Lauren, Lost Girl	Won	
2013	Hottest Hookup in Film/TV	Lauren and Bo, Lost Girl	Won	
2015	Best TV Couple	Bo and Lauren (Doccubus)	Won	

== See also ==
- List of dramatic television series with LGBT characters
- List of fantasy television programs
- List of LGBT characters in television and radio
- List of science fiction TV and radio shows produced in Canada
