= List of Black Sails characters =

Cast of Black Sails in Season 1, from left to right: Toby Schmitz (Jack Rackham), Tom Hopper (Billy Bones), Clara Paget (Anne Bonny), Toby Stephens (Flint), Hannah New (Eleanor Guthrie), Zach McGowan (Charles Vane), Mark Ryan (Hal Gates), Hakeem Kae-Kazim (Mr. Scott), Luke Arnold (John Silver) and Jessica Parker Kennedy (Max)

Black Sails is an American dramatic adventure television series set on New Providence Island and a prequel to Robert Louis Stevenson's novel Treasure Island. The series was created by Jonathan E. Steinberg and Robert Levine for Starz and debuted online for free on YouTube and other various streaming platform and video on demand services on January 18, 2014. The debut on cable television followed a week later on January 25, 2014. Steinberg is executive producer, alongside Michael Bay, Brad Fuller and Andrew Form, while Michael Angeli, Doris Egan, and Levine are co-executive producers.

The following is a list of characters that appeared on the television series.

== Main characters ==
- Toby Stephens as James McGraw/Flint: Captain of the Walrus and the Revenge.
- Hannah New as Eleanor Guthrie: Chief Fence and Supplier in Nassau.
- Luke Arnold as "Long" John Silver: Cook and later Quartermaster of the Walrus and the Revenge.
- Jessica Parker Kennedy as Max: Prostitute and later Brothel madame in Nassau.
- Tom Hopper as William "Billy Bones" Manderly: First mate of the Walrus and the Revenge.
- Zach McGowan as Charles Vane: Captain of the Ranger and the Fancy, Steward of Fort Nassau. (seasons 1–3)
- Toby Schmitz as Jack Rackham: Quartermaster of the Ranger and later Brothel manager and Captain of the Colonial Dawn and the Lion.
- Clara Paget as Anne Bonny: Crew Mate of the Ranger and later of the Colonial Dawn and the Lion.
- Mark Ryan as Hal Gates: Quartermaster of the Walrus and Captain of the Ranger. (season 1)
- Hakeem Kae-Kazim as Mr. Scott: Adviser to Eleanor Guthrie and Captain Benjamin Hornigold and later Quartermaster of the Revenge. (seasons 1–3)
- Sean Cameron Michael as Richard Guthrie: Father to Eleanor and one of the richest merchants in the New World. (seasons 1–2)
- Louise Barnes as Miranda Hamilton/Barlow: Resident of New Providence and Flint's friend and confidant. (seasons 1–3)
- Rupert Penry-Jones as Thomas Hamilton: Son of Lord Proprietor Alfred Hamilton, from London. (seasons 2, 4)
- Luke Roberts as Woodes Rogers: English Captain determined to end piracy in Nassau for good. (seasons 3–4)
- Ray Stevenson as Edward Teach: Captain of the Queen Anne's Revenge. (seasons 3–4)
- David Wilmot as Israel Hands: Bounty hunter and later Crew Mate of the Walrus. (season 4)
- Harriet Walter as Marion Guthrie: Mother to Richard Guthrie and grandmother to Eleanor Guthrie. (season 4)

== Recurring characters ==
=== Multi-season ===
- Lawrence Joffe as Randall: Cook of the Walrus and the Revenge. (seasons 1–2)
- Jannes Eiselen (season 1) and Roland Reed (seasons 2–3) as Dufresne: Accountant and later Quartermaster of the Walrus, the Revenge and the Orion.
- Dylan Skews as Logan: Armorer of the Walrus and the Revenge. (seasons 1–2)
- Lise Slabber as Idelle: Prostitute of the brothel run by Noonan and Jack Rackham in Nassau.
- Richard Lukunku as Joshua: Crew Mate of the Walrus and the Revenge. (seasons 1–2)
- Winston Chong as Joji: Crew Mate of the Walrus and the Revenge.
- Alistair Moulton Black as Dr. Howell: Doctor of the Walrus and the Revenge. (seasons 1–3; guest season 4)
- David Butler as Frasier: Appraiser in Nassau. (seasons 1–2, 4)
- Fiona Ramsay as Mrs. Mapleton: Madam of the brothel run by Noonan in Nassau. (seasons 1, 3; guest seasons 2, 4)
- Graham Weir as Captain Naft: Captain of the Intrepid. (season 1; guest season 2)
- Patrick Lyster as Benjamin Hornigold: Steward of Fort Nassau and Captain of the Royal Lion and the Orion. (seasons 1–3)
- Mark Elderkin as Pastor Lambrick: Head of the local church in Nassau. (seasons 1–2; guest seasons 3–4)
- Andre Jacobs as De Groot: Master of the Walrus and the Revenge.
- Karl Thaning as O'Malley: Mercenary working for Eleanor Guthrie. (season 1; guest season 2)
- Richard Wright-Firth as Muldoon: Gunner of the Walrus and the Revenge. (seasons 1–2; guest season 3)
- John Herbert as Geoffrey Lawrence: Captain of the Black Hind. (season 1; guest season 2)
- David Dukas as Captain Hume: Commander of the Royal Navy's Scarborough. (season 2; guest season 1)
- Laudo Liebenberg as Dooley: Crew Mate of the Walrus and the Revenge. (seasons 2–4)
- Sibongile Mlambo as Eme: Slave aboard the Andromache. (season 2; guest seasons 1, 3–4)
- Patrick Lavisa as Babatunde: Slave aboard the Andromache. (season 2; guest season 1)
- Craig Jackson as Augustus Featherstone: Quartermaster of the Colonial Dawn. (seasons 2–4)
- Calvin Hayward as Wayne: Crew Mate of the Walrus and the Revenge. (season 3; guest season 2)
- Anna-Louise Plowman as Mrs. Hudson: English chambermaid in the employ of Woodes Rogers. (seasons 3–4)
- Wilson Carpenter as Ellers: Crew Mate of the Queen Anne's Revenge, the Revenge and the Lion (seasons 3–4)
- Aidan Whytock as Jacob Garrett: Carpenter's Mate on the Intrepid. (seasons 3–4; guest season 2)
- Craig Hawks as Reuben: Crew Mate of Queen Anne's Revenge and the Revenge (seasons 3–4)
- Moshidi Motshegwa as The Maroon Queen: Mr. Scott's wife and Madi's mother. (seasons 3–4)
- Zethu Dlomo as Madi: Mr. Scott's daughter. (seasons 3–4)
- Chris Fisher as Ben Gunn: Crew Mate of the Walrus. (seasons 3–4)
- Andrian Mazive as Kofi: Member of the Maroon community. (seasons 3–4)
- Rory Acton Burnell as Colin: Crew Mate of the Walrus. (season 4; guest season 3)
- Adam Neill as Mr. Soames: Royal Navy officer. (season 4; guest season 3)

=== Season 1 ===
- Jeremy Crutchley as Morley: Crew Mate of the Walrus.
- Neels Clasen as Hamund: Crew Mate of the Ranger.
- Langley Kirkwood as Dyfed Bryson: Captain of the Andromache.
- Dean McCoubrey as Hayes: Quartermaster of the Andromache.
- Garth Collins as Albinus: Former pirate and Head of a timber business.

=== Season 2 ===
- Tadhg Murphy as Ned Low: Captain of the Fancy.
- Nic Rasenti as Mr. Holmes: Crew Mate of the Fancy.
- Robert Hobbs as Jenks: Pirate under the command of Charles Vane.
- Meganne Young as Abigail Ashe: Daughter of Lord Peter Ashe.
- Adrian Collins as Vincent: Crew Mate of the Revenge.
- Tyrel Meyer as Nicholas: Crew Mate of the Revenge.
- Nick Boraine as Lord Peter Ashe: Governor of the Carolina Colony.
- Danny Keogh as Lord Proprietor Alfred Hamilton: Thomas' father.
- Lars Arentz-Hansen as Colonel William Rhett: Subordinate of Peter Ashe in Charleston.

=== Season 3 ===
- Jenna Saras and Greig Rogers as Death: a dark figure that appears in Flint's visions alongside Miranda.
- Richard Lothian as Dobbs: Crew Mate of the Walrus.
- Jason Cope as Captain Chamberlain: Commodore of the Royal Navy.
- Dan Robbertse as Captain Throckmorton: Pirate Captain on Nassau.
- Siv Ngesi as Udo: Maroon Warrior.
- Michael Kirch as a Pardon Clerk
- Francis Chouler as Lieutenant Perkins: Officer of the Royal Navy.
- Garth Breytenbach as Major Rollins: Officer of the British Army.
- Roger Thomas as Hornigold's Boatswain
- Wayne Harrison as Doctor Marcus: British Doctor.

=== Season 4 ===
- Chris Larkin as Captain Berringer: Officer of the Royal Navy and Rogers's second in command.
- Dale Jackson as Lieutenant Utley: Officer of the Royal Navy.
- Clyde Berning as Lieutenant Kendrick: Officer of the Royal Navy.
- Mike Westcott as Judge Adams: Magistrate in Nassau.
- Milton Schorr as Lieutenant Burrell: Officer of the Royal Navy.
- Sizo Mahlangu as Obi: Maroon Warrior.
- Tinah Mnumzana as Ruth: Slave at Underhill estate.
- Apolinhalo Antonio as Zaki: Maroon Warrior.
- Tony Kgoroge as Julius: Slave at Edwards estate and leader of the Slave rebellion.
- Anton Dekker as Tom Morgan: Pirate Captain on Nassau.
- Theo Landey as First Mate Molin: Crew Mate of the Lion, the Revenge and the Eurydice.
- Mpho Osei-Tutu as a Footman, a servant of Joseph and Marion Guthrie in Philadelphia.

== Notable guest characters ==
=== Multi-season ===
- Kelly Wragg as Alice: Prostitute of the brothel run by Noonan and Jack Rackham in Nassau. (seasons 1–2)
- Russel Savadier as Underhill: Merchant and landowner on New Providence Island. (seasons 2–4)
- Nick Rebelo as Rawls: Merchant on Nassau. (seasons 2, 4)
- James Alexander (season 3) and Jorge Suquet (season 4) as Juan Antonio Grandal: An agent of the Spanish intelligence.
- Nevena Jablanovic as Georgia: Prostitute of the brothel run by Noonan and Jack Rackham in Nassau. (seasons 3–4)

=== Season 1 ===
- Anthony Bishop as Singleton: Crew Mate of the Walrus.
- Tony Caprari as Noonan: Brothel owner in Nassau.
- Quentin Krog as Turk: Crew Mate of the Walrus.
- Frans Hamman as Slade: Crew Mate of the Ranger.
- Jarrid Geduld as Crisp: Crew Mate of the Walrus.
- Graham Clarke as Captain Lilywhite: Opponent to the Guthries.

=== Season 2 ===
- Brendan Murray as Meeks: Former Quartermaster of the Fancy.
- Greg Melvill-Smith as Hennessey: Admiral of the Royal Navy.
- Angelique Pretorius as Charlotte: Prostitute of the brothel run by Jack Rackham in Nassau.
- Martin Van Geems as Larson: Crew Mate of the Fancy.
- Craig MacRae as Yardley: Pirate under the command of Charles Vane.

=== Season 3 ===
- Martin Munro as Palmer: Crew Mate of the Walrus.
- Gideon Lombard as Warren: Crew Mate of the Colonial Dawn.

=== Season 4 ===
- Mary-Anne Barlow as Margaret Underhill: Wife of Mr. Underhill.
- Luka Goodall as Audrey Underhill: Daughter of Mr. Underhill.
- Jason Delplanque as Lieutenant Werth: Officer of the Royal Navy.
- Ilay Kurelovic as Governor Raja: Commander of the Spanish Fleet.
- Jose Domingos as Mr. Oliver: Employee of the Guthrie Trading Company.
- Guy Paul as Joseph Guthrie: Father to Richard Guthrie and grandfather to Eleanor Guthrie.
- Tyrone Keogh as Adams: Crew Mate of the Walrus.
- Ron Smerczak as Mr. McCoy: Crew Mate of the Lion who once sailed with Henry Avery.
- Cara Roberts as Mary Read / Mark Read: Crew Mate of the Lion.

== Appearances ==
= Main cast (credited)
= Recurring cast (3+)
= Guest cast (1-2)

=== Main cast ===
| Character | Portrayed by | Seasons | | | |
| Character | Portrayed by | 1 | 2 | 3 | 4 |
|---|---|---|---|---|---|
| James McGraw / Captain Flint | Toby Stephens | Main | Main | Main | Main |
| Eleanor Guthrie | Hannah New | Main | Main | Main | Main |
| "Long" John Silver | Luke Arnold | Main | Main | Main | Main |
| Max | Jessica Parker Kennedy | Main | Main | Main | Main |
| William "Billy Bones" Manderly | Tom Hopper | Main | Main | Main | Main |
| Charles Vane | Zach McGowan | Main | Main | Main | |
| Jack Rackham | Toby Schmitz | Main | Main | Main | Main |
| Anne Bonny | Clara Paget | Main | Main | Main | Main |
| Hal Gates | Mark Ryan | Main | | | |
| Mr. Scott | Hakeem Kae-Kazim | Main | Main | Main | |
| Richard Guthrie | Sean Cameron Michael | Main | Main | | |
| Miranda Hamilton / Barlow | Louise Barnes | Main | Main | Main | |
| Thomas Hamilton | Rupert Penry-Jones | | Main | | Main (Note: Penry-Jones only appears in one episode of season four, although credited as a main cast member.) |
| Woodes Rogers | Luke Roberts | | | Main | Main |
| Edward Teach / Blackbeard | Ray Stevenson | | | Main | Main |
| Israel Hands | David Wilmot | | | | Main |
| Marion Guthrie | Harriet Walter | | | | Main |

=== Recurring cast ===
| Character | Portrayed by | Seasons | | | |
| Character | Portrayed by | 1 | 2 | 3 | 4 |
|---|---|---|---|---|---|
| Randall | Lawrence Joffe | Recurring | Recurring | | |
| Dufresne | Jannes Eiselen | Recurring | | | |
| Dufresne | Roland Reed | | Recurring | Recurring | |
| Logan | Dylan Skews | Recurring | Recurring | | |
| Idelle | Lise Slabber | Recurring | Recurring | Recurring | Recurring |
| Joshua | Richard Lukunku | Recurring | Recurring | | |
| Joji | Winston Chong | Recurring | Recurring | Recurring | Recurring |
| Dr. Howell | Alistair Moulton Black | Recurring | Recurring | Recurring | Guest |
| Morley | Jeremy Crutchley | Recurring | | | |
| Frasier | David Butler | Recurring | Recurring | | Recurring |
| Mrs. Mapleton | Fiona Ramsay | Recurring | Guest | Recurring | Guest |
| Captain Naft | Graham Weir | Recurring | Guest | | |
| Benjamin Hornigold | Patrick Lyster | Recurring | Recurring | Recurring | |
| Pastor Lambrick | Mark Elderkin | Recurring | Recurring | Guest | Guest |
| Hamund | Neels Clasen | Recurring | | | |
| Captain Dyfed Bryson | Langley Kirkwood | Recurring | | | |
| De Groot | Andre Jacobs | Recurring | Recurring | Recurring | Recurring |
| Hayes | Dean McCoubrey | Recurring | | | |
| Albinus | Garth Collins | Recurring | | | |
| O'Malley | Karl Thaning | Recurring | Guest | | |
| Muldoon | Richard Wright-Firth | Recurring | Recurring | Guest | |
| Captain Geoffrey Lawrence | John Herbert | Recurring | Guest | | |
| Ned Low | Tadhg Murphy | | Recurring | | |
| Mr. Holmes | Nic Rasenti | | Recurring | | |
| Jenks | Robert Hobbs | | Recurring | | |
| Abigail Ashe | Meganne Young | | Recurring | | |
| Captain Hume | David Dukas | Guest | Recurring | | |
| Dooley | Laudo Liebenberg | Stand-in | Recurring | Recurring | Recurring |
| Eme | Sibongile Mlambo | Guest | Recurring | Guest | Guest |
| Vincent | Adrian Collins | | Recurring | | |
| Babatunde | Patrick Lavisa | Guest | Recurring | | |
| Nicholas | Tyrel Meyer | | Recurring | | |
| Lord Peter Ashe | Nick Boraine | | Recurring | | |
| Alfred Hamilton | Danny Keogh | | Recurring | | |
| Augustus Featherstone | Craig Jackson | | Recurring | Recurring | Recurring |
| Colonel William Rhett | Lars Arentz-Hansen | | Recurring | | |
| Death | Jenna Saras/Greig Rogers | | | Recurring | |
| Dobbs | Richard Lothian | | | Recurring | |
| Wayne | Calvin Hayward | | Guest | Recurring | |
| Mrs. Hudson | Anna-Louise Plowman | | | Recurring | Recurring |
| Captain Chamberlain | Jason Cope | | | Recurring | |
| Ellers | Wilson Carpenter | | | Recurring | Recurring |
| Captain Throckmorton | Dan Robbertse | | | Recurring | |
| Jacob Garrett | Aidan Whytock | | Guest | Recurring | Recurring |
| Reuben | Craig Hawks | | | Recurring | Recurring |
| The Maroon Queen | Moshidi Motshegwa | | | Recurring | Recurring |
| Madi | Zethu Dlomo | | | Recurring | Recurring |
| Ben Gunn | Chris Fisher | | | Recurring | Recurring |
| Udo | Sivuyile Ngesi | | | Recurring | |
| Kofi | Andrian Mazive | | | Recurring | Recurring |
| Pardon Clerk | Michael Kirch | | | Recurring | |
| Lieutenant Perkins | Francis Chouler | | | Recurring | |
| Major Rollins | Garth Breytenbach | | | Recurring | |
| Hornigold's Boatswain | Roger Thomas | | | Recurring | |
| Dr. Marcus | Wayne Harrison | | | Recurring | |
| Captain Berringer | Chris Larkin | | | | Recurring |
| Lieutenant Utley | Dale Jackson | | | | Recurring |
| Lieutenant Kendrick | Clyde Berning | | | | Recurring |
| Colin | Rory Acton Burnell | | | Guest | Recurring |
| Mr. Soames | Adam Neill | | | Guest | Recurring |
| Judge Adams | Mike Westcott | | | | Recurring |
| Lieutenant Burrell | Milton Schorr | | | | Recurring |
| Obi | Sizo Mahlangu | | | | Recurring |
| Ruth | Tinah Mnumzana | | | | Recurring |
| Zaki | Apolinhalo Antonio | | | | Recurring |
| Julius | Tony Kgoroge | | | | Recurring |
| Tom Morgan | Anton Dekker | | | | Recurring |
| First Mate Molin | Theo Landey | | | | Recurring |
| Footman | Mpho Osei-Tutu | | | | Recurring |

=== Guest cast ===
| Character | Portrayed by | Seasons | | | |
| Character | Portrayed by | 1 | 2 | 3 | 4 |
|---|---|---|---|---|---|
| Singleton | Anthony Bishop | Guest | | | |
| Captain Parrish | Graham Hopkins | Guest | | | |
| Fisher | Russ McCarroll | Guest | | | |
| Mosiah | Ernest Ndlovu | Guest | | | |
| Sanderson | Paul Snodgrass | Guest | | | |
| Levi | Eddy Ngomba Kalonji | Guest | | | |
| Peter the Repeater | Dan Hirst | Guest | | | |
| Noonan | Tony Caprari | Guest | | | |
| Turk | Quentin Krog | Guest | | | |
| Captain Bridge | Martin Le Maitre | Guest | | | |
| Phillip | Richard Antrobus | Guest | | | |
| Slade | Frans Hamman | Guest | | | |
| Froom | Geoff Kukard | Guest | | | |
| Crisp | Jarrid Geduld | Guest | | | |
| Gruenwald | Greg Parvess | Guest | | | |
| Captain Lilywhite | Graham Clarke | Guest | | | |
| Beauclerc | Shaun Acker | Guest | | | |
| Lars | Michael McCloud | Guest | | | |
| Alice | Kelly Wragg | Guest | Guest | | |
| Captain Jefferson | Andrew Brent | | Guest | | |
| Meeks | Brendan Murray | | Guest | | |
| Pickram | Nicholas Pauling | | Guest | | |
| Admiral Hennessey | Greg Melvill-Smith | | Guest | | |
| Charlotte | Angelique Pretorius | | Guest | | |
| Larson | Martin Van Geems | | Guest | | |
| Linus Harcourt | Andre Weideman | | Guest | | |
| Esther | Laura Higgins | | Guest | | |
| Mr. Underhill | Russel Savadier | | Guest | Guest | Guest |
| Mr. Rawls | Nick Rebelo | | Guest | | Guest |
| Yardley | Craig MacRae | | Guest | | |
| Kensington | Bart Fouche | | Guest | | |
| Magistrate Hazzard | Jonathan Taylor | | | Guest | |
| Tom | Eddie Baroo | | | Guest | |
| Edgar | Kevin Abbott | | | Guest | |
| Celeste | Colette Brand | | | Guest | |
| Hallendale | Carl Van Haght | | | Guest | |
| Murtaugh | Stuart Williamson | | | Guest | |
| Palmer | Martin Munro | | | Guest | |
| Warren | Gideon Lombard | | | Guest | |
| Oates | David Viviers | | | Guest | |
| Juan Antonio Grandal | James Alexander | | | Guest | |
| Juan Antonio Grandal | Jorge Suquet | | | | Guest |
| Netta | Sylvaine Strike | | | Guest | |
| Georgia | Nevena Jablanovic | | | Guest | Guest |
| Chidi | Lemogang Tsipa | | | Guest | |
| Margaret Underhill | Mary-Anne Barlow | | | | Guest |
| Audrey Underhill | Luka Goodall | | | | Guest |
| Lieutenant Werth | Jason Delplanque | | | | Guest |
| Mr. Harrison | Andrew Roux | | | | Guest |
| Milton | Kerry Gregg | | | | Guest |
| Sayle | Anthony C. Hyde | | | | Guest |
| Amara | Ebby Weyime | | | | Guest |
| Governor Raja | Ilay Kurelovic | | | | Guest |
| Mr. Oliver | Jose Domingos | | | | Guest |
| Joseph Guthrie | Guy Paul | | | | Guest |
| Lydia | Amy Letcher | | | | Guest |
| Adams | Tyrone Keogh | | | | Guest |
| Mr. McCoy | Ron Smerczak | | | | Guest |
| Mary Read / Mark Read | Cara Roberts | | | | Guest |
| James Oglethorpe | Robert Fridjhon | | | | Guest |
