= List of bisexual characters in television =

This is a list of bisexual characters in live action television series (includes terrestrial, cable, and streaming shows). The orientation can be portrayed on-screen, described in the dialogue or mentioned. Roles include lead, main, recurring, supporting, and guest.

The names are organized in alphabetical order by the surname (i.e. last name), or by a single name if the character does not have a surname. Some naming customs write the family name first followed by the given name; in these cases, the names in the list appear under the family name (e.g. the name Jung Seo-hyun [Korean] is organized alphabetically under "J").

== Women ==
Character	Portrayed by	Program	Notes	Ref(s)
Abby	Natalie Morales	Abby's	Identifies herself as bisexual in season 1 episode 3.	
Abbi Abrams	Abbi Jacobson	Broad City	Abbi dates men through most of the series. In season 5, she starts dating Lesley, a doctor.	
Emaline Addario	Sydney Sweeney	Everything Sucks!	For the first half of the season, Emaline dates Oliver, a male classmate. Following their breakup Emaline becomes attracted to classmate and series protagonist Kate Messner; they admit they like each other and later kiss.	
Cassie Ainsworth	Hannah Murray	Skins	Cassie has anorexia nervosa, low self-esteem, suicidal thoughts, and drug addiction.	
Natalia Rivera Aitoro	Jessica Leccia	Guiding Light	Natalia has one young son and is in a relationship with Olivia Spencer, who received a heart transplant from Natalia's ex, Gus.	
Frankie Alan	Ruta Gedmintas	Lip Service	It's made very clear she likes women, and she also has sex with a man.	
Akemi	Michelle Ang	Xena: Warrior Princess	Akemi was a protege of Xena's who later committed suicide.	
Lily Aldrin	Alyson Hannigan	How I Met Your Mother	In a long-term relationship with Marshall Eriksen, but also expresses attraction to women on multiple occasions, especially about her friend Robin Scherbatsky, and says that one of her life goals before marrying Marshall was to have a "lesbian relationship."	
Christina "Chris" Alonso	Lina Esco	S.W.A.T.	The sole female officer in SWAT who is just as tough as any of the men and she had an ex-girlfriend named Kira, along with two ex-boyfriends (Clark Thompson and Ty).	
Archie	Madeleine Sami	Our Flag Means Death	Refers to having male lovers in the past, and starts a relationship with Jim, a nonbinary crewmate.	
Ariadne	Sophia Lauchlin Hirt	Olympus	Ariadne is a princess and the daughter of Aegeus and King Minos.	
Astrid	Josefin Asplund	Vikings	Astrid is a shield-maiden and becomes Lagertha's lover. In the second half of season 4, they have been together for several years. She also has sex with Lagertha's son Bjorn, and upsets Lagertha by doing this. In season 5, she is kidnapped and wedded to Harald Finehair. Pregnant with an unwanted child, Astrid confronts Lagertha in battlefield and asks Lagertha to kill her. When Lagertha hesitates, Astrid lunges at Lagertha with her sword and is killed.	
Jane Austen	N/A	Doctor Who	An off-screen romance between the celebrated author and Clara Oswald is implied in two episodes. In The Magician's Apprentice, Clara states that Austen "is a phenomenal kisser." In episode Face the Raven, Oswald says to her friend Rigsy, "Sometimes Jane Austen and I prank each other. She's the worst, I love her. Take that how you like."	
Saanvi Bahl	Parveen Kaur	Manifest	Saanvi has romantic relationships with Alex, a female doctor, and Ben Stone.	
Sarah Barnes	Loui Batley	Hollyoaks	"I don't know if she'd suddenly turned, though. Maybe she was more bisexual than anything." - Loui Batley on her character's sexuality.	
Nancy Bartlett	Sandra Bernhard	Roseanne	After Nancy's marriage to Arnie was over, she came out as a lesbian, and later, as bisexual.	
Juliet Becker	Rae Baker	The Bill	Juliet is openly bisexual, and had an affair with a married woman. She was later stabbed and died.	
Mariana Belcombe	Anna Madeley	The Secret Diaries of Miss Anne Lister	Mariana is Anne Lister's secret lover.	
Claire Bennet	Hayden Panettiere	Heroes	Claire Bennet is shown liking men and being seriously involved with a boyfriend. In season 4 episode "Hysterical Blindness", she's kissed by her roommate Gretchen Berg. Although she later spurned Gretchen's interest in her, in "Pass/Fail" she apologizes for having done so and admits that she wants, and is ready, to be with her. They hold hands as they walk away. The series was cancelled and their relationship was not further developed.	
Gretchen Berg	Madeline Zima	Heroes	Gretchen Berg is a college student of Arlington University who becomes Claire Bennet's roommate and befriends her. In season 4 episode "Hysterical Blindness", she is revealed to be bisexual when she confesses to Claire that she has a crush on her, and kisses her.	
Beth	Kari Matchett	Wonderfalls	Beth is the ex-wife of Thomas, who tried to get a date with Sharon, but she was not interested in him because she's a lesbian. Sharon becomes interested in Beth and they start dating. In one episode, Beth slept with Thomas but right after she also had sex with Sharon.	
Bilquis	Yetide Badaki	American Gods	An ancient goddess of love and sexuality, she receives worship in the form of ritualistic sexual encounters with both men and women.	
Maddie Bishop	Fola Evans-Akingbola	Siren	Maddie has a boyfriend, Ben, but she is receptive to the attraction that Ryn (a mermaid) shows towards her. She and Ben later form polyamorous triad with Ryn.	
Margot Bishop	Sonya Walger	The Catch	She had an affair with Felicity, an assassin sent by her brother to kill her.	
Maya Bishop	Danielle Savre	Station 19	Maya tells her friends Andy Herrera and Victoria Hughes that taking care of herself includes "lots of sex" with "a series of ladies and gents" (S1 episode "Contain the Flame") in season 3 "Into the woods" she meets Carina Deluca and they start their relationship and get married (S4 episode "Forever and Ever, Amen").	
Grace Black	Tamara Wall	Hollyoaks	Grace has sexual relations with Esther, Trevor and Kim, who becomes obsessed with Grace.	
Jerri Blank	Amy Sedaris	Strangers with Candy	Jerri is a 47-year-old ex-con, ex-junkie, ex-prostitute, and high-school freshman at Flatpoint High.	
Alana Bloom	Caroline Dhavernas	Hannibal	Alana expresses interest in Will Graham in the first season, enters a relationship with Hannibal Lecter in the second season, and ultimately marries and has a child with Margot Verger. Bryan Fuller has repeatedly referred to her as bisexual.	
Lauren Bloom	Janet Montgomery	New Amsterdam	Dr. Lauren Bloom has relationships with Dr. Floyd Reynolds, Dr. Zach Ligon, and Dr. Leyla Shinwari.	
Taylor Bloom	Katherine McNamara	Love, Classified	Taylor owns a plant and flower shop, and is the daughter of a famous author. She has never engaged in online dating before, but on impulse checks the dating section of "Classified", an app for local announcements, and responds anonymously to a description she likes. She accepts to meet the anonymous person on a coffee date. She is surprised to discover that the blind date is a woman, Francesca Murray, and she has never before met a woman who interested her.	
Anne Bonny	Clara Paget	Black Sails	Anne was lover and life-partner with fellow pirate Jack Rackham before she met Max, a prostitute in a Nassau brothel, and they became lovers.	
Anne Bonny	Minnie Driver	Our Flag Means Death	Based on the real-life pirate Anne Bonny, she is in a long-term relationship with Mary Read, but also makes a pass at Stede Bonnet.	
Nova Bordelon	Rutina Wesley	Queen Sugar	Nova, one of the protagonists, is in a relationship with Chantal, and then with Dr Dubois.	
Kristen Bouchard	Katja Herbers	Evil	Married to Andy, and struggles with her attraction to David throughout the show. She has sensual encounters with a nun and a female dancer. Her friend Yasmine also states that Kristen dated women in the past, as well as men.	
Haddie Braverman	Sarah Ramos	Parenthood	Has happily been in relationships with both men and women.	
Chloe Brennan	April Rose Pengilly	Neighbours	Has had relationships with men and women.	
Charlie Buckton	Esther Anderson	Home and Away	When Charlie first arrived in the Bay, Channel Seven described her as having a "bone to pick and the prowess to do it" in reference to her father's relationship with Morag Bellingham (Cornelia Frances), which Charlie disapproved of because her mother had only recently died.	
Rosita Bustillos	Tamara Duarte	Wynonna Earp	During the Season 2 Episode 9 episode 'Forever Mine, Never Mind', Rosita invites Waverly Earp to share a hot tub with her. During the course of the scene, they share a kiss that Waverly initiates, but Rosita returns. They both break away, knowing that they both owe fidelity to their respective lovers.	
Diane Butcher	Sophie Lawrence	EastEnders	A free-spirited teen who becomes a single mother and tries to look for her son, later beginning a long-term romantic relationship with a woman in France.	
Caroline Buxton	Tandi Wright	Shortland Street	Caroline leaves her fiancé for her bridesmaid, and then back to another man.	
Caitlin	Zelda Williams	Teen Wolf	Initially introduced as a lesbian character in her first appearance in season 3a, she was subsequently brought back for an episode of season 3b and was identified as bisexual.	
Addison "Addy" Carver	Anastasia Baranova	Z Nation	Addison is seen flirting with another woman in season 2 Episode 11. However, more explicit representation (i.e. kissing, sex) was cut from the final episode.	
Cecelia Cannon	Caitlin Barlow	Teachers	Cecelia's sexuality has been speculated about by other characters throughout the show. During a party in Season 2 Episode 7 Cecelia makes out with a woman and tells her she is bisexual.	
Amanita Caplan	Freema Agyeman	Sense8	Dyed her hair in the colors of the bisexual pride flag and is in a relationship with Nomi.	
Brenna Carver	Haley Ramm	Chasing Life	Brenna has been in a relationship with two boys and two girls throughout the show. She has explicitly stated multiple times she is bisexual and joins the LGBT+ club in her school.	
Dorothy Castlemore	Gwenlyn Cumyn	All for One	(Web series) A smart and capable woman, she was once dating Miller and is now dating Connie.	
Beatrix "Bird" Castro	Vanessa Morgan	Finding Carter	Bird kissed Carter's old friend named Madison, who is a girl, in I Knew You Were Trouble but never clearly stated her sexual preferences.	
Rosie Chadderton	Lorna Pegler	Is Harry on the Boat?		
Piper Chapman	Taylor Schilling	Orange is the New Black	When the series begins, Piper is engaged to a man named Larry. She had a relationship with a woman named Alex Vause prior to the start of the show, which is rekindled as the show progresses.	
Alice Charles	Julia Schlaepfer	The Politician	Alice initially only has relationships with men, including a long time relationship with her classmate Payton Hobart, an affair with Payton's best friend James Sullivan, and a brief engagement to a male classmate. She later develops a short term polyamorous relationship with Payton and Astrid Sloan before eventually dumping Astrid and marrying Payton.	
Chloe	Nina Liu	The Secret Life of Us	Chloe's girlfriend is Miranda.	
Grace Choi	Chantal Thuy	Black Lightning	Becomes the girlfriend of Anissa Pierce.	
Cassandra Cillian	Lindy Booth	The Librarians	Admitted having feelings for Jenkins and later kissed a lady vampire.	
Marissa Cooper	Mischa Barton	The O.C.	She had relationships with Ryan and Alex through the series.	
Roisin Connor	Siobhan McCarthy	Bad Girls	Roisin was sentenced to four years in prison after covering up embezzlement by her financial firm boss and her secret girlfriend, Cassie Tyler. Her husband, Aidan, was convinced they could start a new life back in their home country of Ireland once her sentence was over.	
Lindsey Corkhill	Claire Sweeney	Brookside	Ex-wife of Gary Stanlow and Peter Phelan, and wife of Barry Grant who had a number of relationships with men and women.	
Delphine Cormier	Evelyne Brochu	Orphan Black	A scientist who fell for Cosima and began helping her learn more about her nature as a clone.	
Ava Daniels	Hannah Einbinder	Hacks	Was in a relationship with Ruby (lesbian). Has sex with random males. Almost had a threesome with a lesbian couple. Discovers that her new tenant is lesbian and has sex with her.	
Angela Darmody	Aleksa Palladino	Boardwalk Empire	Angela was Jimmy Darmody's wife; in season 1, she had a brief affair with Mary. In season 2 she was killed after having sex with Louise, a novelist.	
Ashley Davies	Mandy Musgrave	South of Nowhere	Ashley was dating Aiden Dennison, they had sex and she became pregnant. She later suffered a miscarriage and they broke up. Ashley then started dating Spencer Carlin. In a special web episode ("Five Years Later") after the television series ended, an adult Ashley and Spencer are a married couple, expecting their first child together. The child was conceived using Spencer's eggs, fathered by Aiden, with Ashley carrying the baby.	
Jadzia Dax	Terry Farrell	Star Trek: Deep Space Nine	Jadzia is a trill, a species which can act as hosts for symbionts. Symbionts can have many hosts in their lifetimes and retain their memories from their time being joined with each host. One of Dax's previous hosts was Torias. In the season 4 episode "Rejoined," she meets Lenara Khan, who is the host of the symbiont was previously joined to the wife of Torias Dax. Jadzia and Lenara rekindle their relationship, without concern for the fact that they are now both women. Lenara ultimately breaks off the relationship, due to the stigma in Trill society of "reassociating" with people from a past host's lifetime.	
Pamela "Pam" Swynford de Beaufort	Kristin Bauer van Straten	True Blood	A vampire who loves men and women.	
Julián de La Mora	Darío Yazbek Bernal	La Casa de las Flores	In season 1 episode 1, Julián is cheating on his girlfriend Lucía with the family's financial advisor, Diego. In episode 3, Julián comes out as bisexual to his family.	
Beatriz de Souza	Bruna Marquezine	Nada Será Como Antes	She is killed by her boyfriend, who is jealous of her.	
Comte de Vache	Jennifer Saunders	Let Them Eat Cake	The most reviled woman in France.	
Carina DeLuca	Stefania Spampinato	Grey's Anatomy and Station 19	She has a relationship with a man named Owen Hunt and later begins dating a woman named Maya Bishop and they get married in season 4 "Forever and Ever, Amen".	
Bo Dennis	Anna Silk	Lost Girl	Bo is a succubus, a Fae that survives by feeding from life force and the energy created from sex with males or females. Bo becomes romantically and sexually involved with Dyson (a Light Fae detective) and Lauren (a human doctor). ("....she's a sexual creature and she falls in love with both Dyson and Lauren." - Anna Silk on her character's sexual orientation.	)
Dayanara Diaz	Dascha Polanco	Orange is the New Black	Though appearing to be straight for the first five seasons, Dayanara begins a relationship with Dominga "Daddy" Duarte when she realizes she is going to be in prison for life.	
Rosa Diaz	Stephanie Beatriz	Brooklyn Nine-Nine	Rosa affirms her bisexuality in the series' fifth season episode, "99".	
Christina Dichiera (aka Felicity Mathews)	Jacinta Stapleton	Stingers	She kisses the female protagonist, Angie Piper (Kate Kendall), after she mistakenly believes that Angie's declaring her love for her (in actuality, Angie was confessing her feelings for their colleague Peter Church (Peter Phelps), the series' male protagonist). Chris later had an affair with Katherine Marks (the daughter of her unit's commander, Luke Harris), and with a woman while working undercover. She later becomes attracted to the unit's new male operative Leo Flynn (Daniel Frederiksen).	
Emily Dickinson	Hailee Steinfeld	Dickinson	A young poet who has romances with women and men.	
Alison DiLaurentis	Sasha Pieterse	Pretty Little Liars & Pretty Little Liars: The Perfectionists	She has several romantic relationships with men, but eventually gets engaged to Emily Fields.	
Dina	Isabela Merced	The Last of Us	In a relationship with Jesse and later Ellie.	
Debbie Dingle	Charley Webb	Emmerdale	Had a brief relationship with Jasmine Thomas (Jenna Coleman), but has mainly been with men, including Andy Sugden (Kelvin Fletcher) and Cameron Murray (Dominic Power).	
Mary Dittrich	Lisa Joyce	Boardwalk Empire	Mary has an affair with Angela.	
Shell Dockley	Debra Stephenson	Bad Girls	Love interest of Daniella "Denny" Blood, while also trading sexual favors with Jim Fenner.	
Caitlin Dowd	Bonnie Somerville	Cashmere Mafia	During the show, she was romantically attracted to another woman, leading her to rethink her life "previously spent dating only men."	
Haley Dunphy	Sarah Hyland	Modern Family	Dates men, and alludes to being attracted to women multiple times. Sarah Hyland confirmed that Haley is bisexual.	
Waverly Earp	Dominique Provost-Chalkley	Wynonna Earp	Had been with long-term boyfriend Champ until she met Nicole Haught and fell for her. Nicole is the first woman Waverly had ever been attracted to and was caught off guard by her feelings for Nicole.	
Kat Edison	Aisha Dee	The Bold Type	She is attracted to a female artist named Adena despite calling herself a "proud hetero."	
Karen Ellis	Tanya Franks	Family Affairs	Karen left Matt for Kelly. After Matt killed Kelly, she forgave him and went back to him.	
Camille Engelson	Allison Scagliotti	Stitchers	Her only known relationship was with boyfriend Linus. In episode 4 of Season 2 she says "Dirk and I only dated for about a week. I dated his sister a lot longer." In Season 3, Camille falls in love with medical examiner Amanda Weston and in episode 4 says to Amanda, "My life makes sense with you in it." Her bisexuality was confirmed by her actress.	
Eretria	Ivana Baquero	The Shannara Chronicles	She had feelings for Wil in Season 1 and became the love interest of Princess Lyria in Season 2.	
Nina Farr	Rebekah Gibbs	Casualty	An ambulance driver.	
Felicity	Shivani Ghai	The Catch	Felicity was an assassin sent to kill Margot Bishop, but instead ends up having an affair with her.	
Samantha Fink	Sofia Black-D'Elia	Single Drunk Female	While attending a sober party, Samantha bumps into Chloe and has sex with her in the bathroom.	
Kris Fisher	Gerard McCarthy	Hollyoaks	Kris had an affair with Ravi Roy and Nancy Hayton, however, Nancy and Ravi were also in a relationship together, but neither one of them knew the other one was also sleeping with Kris.	
Fleabag	Phoebe Waller-Bridge	Fleabag	Has an on-again, off-again relationship with Harry. She sleeps with a number of men, and flirts with both men and women. In season 2, she tries to kiss Belinda at the bar.	
Sonia Fowler	Natalie Cassidy	EastEnders	Sonia's first flirtation with a woman was when she kissed her best friend Naomi. She also has been married to Martin, and has also been involved with Tina Carter.	
Billie Frasier	Laura Benanti	Starved	Billie is a singer-songwriter.	
Donna Freedman	Margot Robbie	Neighbours	Donna shares a kiss with Sunny Lee, and eventually marries Ringo Brown.	
Gabrielle	Renee O'Connor	Xena: Warrior Princess	She and Xena became best friends over the course of the series, but despite the love they obviously felt for each other they never officially became a couple.	
Gaia	Jaime Murray	Spartacus: Gods of the Arena	Gaia has been involved with her friend Lucretia, and several men, eventually being killed by Tullius.	
Tabitha Galavan	Jessica Lucas	Gotham	After arriving in Gotham, Tabitha begins a relationship with Barbara Kean, when Barbara falls into a coma after a fight with her ex-fiancé, she then meets Butch, and is involved with him.	
Monica Gallagher	Annabelle Apsion Chloe Webb	Shameless (UK) Shameless (US)	Married to Frank Gallagher, but has female lovers as well.	
Esther García	Fátima Baeza	Hospital Central	Dated several men before marrying Maca.	
Jasmine Garza	Luvia Petersen	Continuum	Moving through time with other "freedom fighters," she is openly bisexual.	
DSI Stella Gibson	Gillian Anderson	The Fall	In the third episode of the second season, she mouth-kisses Reed Smith (Archie Panjabi) to drive away the advances from a male, and the two then headed to Gibson's hotel room but Smith changed her mind.	
Dr. Emily Grace	Georgina Reilly	Murdoch Mysteries	Emily had relationships with male characters (most notably, George Crabtree and Leslie Garland). In Season 8 episode "High Voltage", she meets suffragette Lillian Moss. Emily falls in love with her and has a romantic relationship with Lillian.	
Inez Green	Leah Gibson	Jessica Jones	One of Jeri Hogarth's lovers.	
Yara Greyjoy	Gemma Whelan	Game of Thrones	Sleeps with a woman in a brothel and alludes to sleeping with both men and women: "A boy, a girl. Depends on the port."	
Clarke Griffin	Eliza Taylor	The 100	Had relationships with male character Finn and female character Lexa; said "I love you" to both. Was also physically involved with female character Niylah and male character Cillian.	
Rosie Gulliver	Sarah Solemani	Bad Education	Dated multiple men and also dated a female former student.	
Eleanor Guthrie	Hannah New	Black Sails	Has a complicated on-again, off-again relationship with Charles Vane. In the beginning of season one she and Max, who is a woman, are lovers.	
Rana Habeeb (aka Rana Nazir)	Bhavna Limbachia	Coronation Street	Rana is a married Muslim woman and has an affair with Kate Connor.	
Remy "Thirteen" Hadley	Olivia Wilde	House	Is seen in sexual and romantic relationships with males and females. In one episode, she talks about her bisexuality to a co-worker.	
Hadley Hale	Lindsey Haun	True Blood	Hadley was the lover of vampire queen Sophie-Anne, and also had a son with her ex-husband Remy Savoy.	
Judy Hale	Linda Cardellini	Dead to Me	Judy has relationships with Steve, Nick, and Michelle.	
Mira Harberg	Alicia Vikander	Irma Vep	Was involved in a sexual relationship with her assistant Laurie.	
Evelyn Harper	Holland Taylor	Two and a Half Men	During the show, she has dated women and men.	
Holly Hart	Sandra Huggett	Family Affairs	Had a relationship with Susie Ross, then with Dave Matthews.	
Gemma Hastings	Thalissa Teixeira	Trigonometry	Is stated to have dated women in the past and later forms a polyamorous triad with her husband Kieran and their friend and lodger Ray.	
Shawna Hawkins	Elliot Page	Tales of the City	Shawna is a bartender.	
Alison Hawthorne-Price	Juliet Rylance	American Gothic	Alison is the Mayor of Boston.	
Mariana Herrera	Paulina Goto	Madre Solo Hay Dos		
Georgina Hobart	Gwyneth Paltrow	The Politician	In season 1 Georgina leaves her husband Keaton for her female horse trainer, Brigitte. She later has relationships with Alison and Tino McCutcheon.	
Imogen Hollins	Charlie Clemmow	Doctors	Forms relationships with men and women.	
Jean Holloway	Naomi Watts	Gypsy	Married to a man, and sexually involved with Sidney Pierce.	
Holly	Billie Piper	True Love	Is romantically involved with and implied to be sexually involved with Karen.	
Susan Ivanova	Claudia Christian	Babylon 5	Shows attraction to men, has an offscreen relationship with telepath Talia Winters.	
Bradley Jackson	Reese Witherspoon	The Morning Show	Jackson is a morning news anchor for The Morning Show. In season two she becomes sexually involved with and dates fellow journalist, Laura Peterson (lesbian), leading to her being outed in the tabloids. She describes herself as a "gay bisexual type".	
Audrey Jensen	Bex Taylor-Klaus	Scream	Refers to herself as bicurious.	
Melantha Jhirl	Jodie Turner-Smith	Nightflyers	Melantha is a genetically enhanced human aboard the starship Nightflyer, which is traveling to an alien starship that is to be studied. She has sex with all four men on board and two of the women, within the third week of their mission.	
Elizabeth Johnson	Lady Gaga	American Horror Story: Hotel	Countess Johnson was involved in a polyamorous relationship with Rudolph Valentino and Natacha Rambova. Through the decades she has had many other lovers both male and female including Donovan, Tristan Duffy, Ramona Royale and her husband James Patrick March.	
Keely Jones	Juno Temple	Ted Lasso	In addition to dating both Jamie and Roy, she later has a relationship with a woman named Jack, and playfully flirts with Rebecca.	
Samantha Jones	Kim Cattrall	Sex and the City	Though most of her relationships and sexual encounters were with men, she also had a relationship with Maria.	
Amber Kalirai	Nikki Patel	Coronation Street		
Katy	Michelle Mylett	Letterkenny	Katy begins the series dating both Reilly and Jonesy, and later pursues Bonnie McMurray. She also hooks up with Mrs. McMurray in the St. Patrick's Day special "St. Perfect's Day."	
Ash Kaur	Gurlaine Kaur Garcha	EastEnders	She is in a relationship with Iqra Ahmed.	
Barbara Kean	Erin Richards	Gotham	Was involved romantically with Renee Montoya.	
Annalise Keating	Viola Davis	How to Get Away With Murder	She has had relationships with both men and women (such as Sam Keating, Nate Lahey, and Eve Rothlo) who reportedly dies at one point in the series.	
Keelin	Christina Moses	The Originals	Keelin is in a relationship with Freya.	
Kelly	Gugu Mbatha-Raw	Black Mirror (Episode: "San Junipero")	Once married to a man she loved, Kelly is living a free-spirited existence in a simulated reality where she dates men – until she meets Yorkie, a lesbian. She falls in love with Yorkie and chooses to remain together with her.	
Alex Kelly	Olivia Wilde	The O.C.	She was in relationships with Marissa Cooper and Seth Cohen while she was on the series.	
Tina Kennard	Laurel Holloman	The L Word	She had relationships with men and women in the series, the most important of all with Bette.	
Pat Kerrigan	Liz May Brice	Bad Girls	Has a relationship with her cellmate Sheena William. Had a boyfriend before going to prison.	
Jane Kerkovich-Williams	Eliza Coupe	Happy Endings	She had a lesbian stage during college, although she is married to Brad Williams.	
Katherine Kim	Grace Park	A Million Little Things	Katherine is a lawyer and mother of Theo. She estranged from husband Eddie Saville.	
Molly Kroll	Clementine Ford	The L Word	Molly had a crush on Shane.	
Lena Kundera	Olga Sosnovska	All My Children	Lena's love interests included Bianca Montgomery, Boyd Larraby and Michael Cambias. (Her relationship with Bianca was commonly referred to as Lianca.)	
Lagertha	Katheryn Winnick	Vikings	Lagertha is a shield-maiden and a Queen. She has had sexual relationships with men multiple times (including being married to two). In season 4 she enters into a relationship with Astrid, a shield-maiden, and they are together for several years. In season 5, after Astrid was kidnapped and wedded to a king, a pregnant Astrid meets Lagertha in battle and asks to be killed. Lagertha didn't want to do it, but Astrid lunges at her and Lagertha is forced to kill Astrid.	
C.J. Lamb	Amanda Donohoe	L.A. Law	After winning a case together, C.J. and Abby Perkins walked into a parking lot, hugged, and then kissed. The next day, they both declared their attraction to men and decided to be best friends instead.	
Sara Lance	Caity Lotz	Arrow Legends of Tomorrow	Sara, a trained assassin and current team leader of the Legends, had relationships with Nyssa al Ghul and Oliver Queen on Arrow. On Legends of Tomorrow she had brief flings with men and women before entering a serious relationship with, and eventually marrying, Ava Sharpe.	
Miranda Lang	Abi Tucker	The Secret Life of Us	Girlfriend of Chloe and likely bisexual.	
Tourmaline Larou	Karla Crome	Carnival Row	Tourmaline and Vignette Stonemoss were lovers in the past and are now close friends. In season 1 she has been shown as having feelings for Vignette. She survives in the Burgue as a sex worker in a Fae brothel, where her clients have been male. (It's possible that she may be lesbian and prefers sexual intimacy and romantic love with women.)	
Laura	Laura Ainsworth	Hollyoaks	Laura slept with Charlotte, and soon after she slept with Zak.	
Laurie	Adria Arjona	Irma Vep	Mira Harberg's ex-lover and former assistant. Married Herman, a filmmaker who directed Mira's latest movie.	
Sophie-Anne Leclerq	Evan Rachel Wood	True Blood	She was in a relationship with Hadley, and also had many relationships with the vampires she created.	
Maggie Lin	Julia Taylor Ross	Saving Hope	Has previously dated men. She becomes romantically interested in Dr. Sydney Katz and they kiss and have sex. Later, Zach Miller sets up an online dating profile for Maggie that includes interest in male and female candidates. In season 5, she reunited with Sydney and they begin dating.	
Portia Lin / Two / Rebecca	Melissa O'Neil	Dark Matter	Powered by nanites and born as Rebecca, Two is a robot who was in love with Dr. Shaw. When the Dr. started to die, he had a robot built in her likeness with the intent of having Shaw put in the body. Sometime before all that happened, she became Portia Lin, a space pirate and lost all her memories.	
Peri Lomax	Ruby O'Donnell	Hollyoaks	She is in a relationship with a man named Tom, flirts with a man named Alfie Nightingale, and later begins a relationship with a woman named Harley Frater.Eventually she falls in love with Juliet Nightingale and they get engaged.	
Ruby / Red Lucas	Meghan Ory	Once Upon a Time	In season one she was in love with Peter, who dies tragically. In season five episode "Ruby Slippers", she reveals to Mulan that what she should have been searching for, instead of her pack, was someone like Dorothy Gale. Her True Love kiss awakens Dorothy from a sleeping spell and after this they become lovers.	
Lucretia	Lucy Lawless	Spartacus: Blood and Sand Spartacus: Gods of the Arena Spartacus: Vengeance	She has had sexual and romantic relationships with both men and women.	
Kith Lyonne	Sarita Choudhury	Jessica Jones	Was in a relationship with Jeri Hogarth, while Jeri was also having a secret affair with Wendy. They broke up. Kith went on to marry Peter and have a daughter. Twenty-five years later, Jeri tries to renew their relationship.	
Mary Agnes MacNue	Merritt Wever	Godless	After her husband is killed, she takes over the role of the town's mayor, wears her late husband's clothes, and becomes involved in a romantic same-sex relationship with Callie Dunne.	
Queen Maeve / Maggie Shaw	Dominique McElligott	The Boys	Maeve has been in relationships with both Homelander and Elena. At first she is, however, closeted regarding Elena until she is outed by Homelander as lesbian on live television. Later Elena clarifies that Maeve is, in fact, bisexual.	
Helen Magnus	Amanda Tapping	Sanctuary	A two-and-a-half century old scientist, thanks to vampire blood, she runs the global Sanctuary Network.	
Mandy	Mia Kirshner	24	Mandy was a terrorist and professional assassin, Mandy was notable for being one of the few antagonists of the series to remain alive during the entire run. She was in relationships with Bridgit, Martin and Gary.	
Sarah Manning	Tatiana Maslany	Orphan Black	She initiates a steamy encounter with a woman and her boyfriend at a bar, but mostly with the other woman. She has also been romantically involved with Cal, who fathered her daughter Kira.	
Evony Fleurette Marquise / The Morrigan	Emmanuelle Vaugier	Lost Girl	The Morrigan, leader of the Dark Fae, seduces males and allows herself to be seduced by women, Bo in Season 2 and Lauren in Season 4.	
Cara Mason	Tabrett Bethell	Legend of the Seeker	Cara had relationships with Dahlia and Leo.	
Mathilde	Alwara Höfels	Mord mit Aussicht	Mathilde, a carpenter, states she is open to relationships with both men and women.	
Maya	Esther Povitsky	Crazy Ex-Girlfriend	When Darryl came out as bisexual, Maya announced that she was bisexual as well, in season 1 episode 14, "Josh Is Going to Hawaii!".	
Mazikeen ("Maze")	Lesley-Ann Brandt	Lucifer	Regularly sleeps with both men and women. She has previously had a relationship with Lucifer, and later develops a relationship with Eve.	
Debbie McAllister	Natalie Roles	The Bill	She was married to Tom until his death, then started dating Juliet, who died, then went out with Jack.	
Michelle McBride	Maria Bello	Goliath	Ex-wife of Billy McBride, Michelle kisses Callie Senate in episode "It's Donald". She enters into a same-sex affair with her.	
Mini McGuinness	Freya Mavor	Skins	A teenage girl who explores her bisexuality.	
Sally McKenna	Sarah Paulson	American Horror Story: Hotel	Sally fell in love with two musicians, a man and a woman, and later had a threesome with them.	
Mary Agnes McNue	Merritt Wever	Godless	A widow in a frontier town who enters a romantic relationship with Callie Dunne.	
Paige Michalchuk	Lauren Collins	Degrassi: The Next Generation	Has dated a number of male characters, and one female character. (Actress Lauren Collins believes that Paige doesn't label herself, though she is often referred to in the media and by fans as bisexual.)	
Freya Mikaelson	Riley Voelkel	The Originals	In a relationship with Keelin.	
Hope Mikaelson	Danielle Rose Russell	Legacies	She has dated men and had a crush on Josie Saltzman when they were younger.	
Nicole Miller	Sally Martin	Shortland Street	Nicole is a theatre nurse, who is engaged to fellow nurse Maeve Mullins.	
Nico Minoru	Lyrica Okano	Runaways	After breaking up with Alex Wilder, Nico begins developing feelings for Karolina Dean. At a dance, Karolina hesitatingly kisses Nico and pulls back, but Nico reciprocated. In a later episode, Nico initiates their second kiss. That night, she and Karolina are seen together, spooning as they sleep.	
Eva Kviig Mohn	Lisa Teige	Skam	Eva never explicitly states her sexuality, but she was in relationships with men and she kisses several times Vilde Lien Hellerud. The creator of the show confirmed she was bisexual.	
Angela Montenegro	Michaela Conlin	Bones	Angela, of mixed Chinese and White ancestry, once had a relationship with a woman, which was briefly rekindled in the show's fourth season. She is married to Jack Hodgins, with whom she has a son.	
Mabel Mora	Selena Gomez	Only Murders in the Building	Mabel has romantic ties with Oscar, Alice, and Tobert.	
Dylan Moreland	Alexandra Hedison	The L Word	Dylan was involved with Danny Wilson and Helena Peabody, whom she later sued for sexual harassment.	
Lorna Morello	Yael Stone	Orange is the New Black	An inmate at Litchfield Penitentiary who has relationships with men and women.	
Hayes Morrison	Hayley Atwell	Conviction	In a relationship with Conner Wallace, had a girlfriend named Naomi Golden.	
Mrs. McMurray	Melanie Scrofano	Letterkenny	Is married to McMurray, and the couple are swingers. She also hooks up with Katy in the St. Patrick's Day special "St. Perfect's Day."	
Nadja of Antipaxos	Natasia Demetriou	What We Do in the Shadows	Nadja is married to Laszlo, and in an off-again, on-again relationship with Gregor each time he is reincarnated, including one instance in which he was a woman. She also participates in orgies with both men and women, alongside her husband.	
Toby Nance	Crystal Lowe	Primeval: New World	Toby is a young physics prodigy, who is part of a specialized team that investigates dinosaurs and other dangerous predators emerging onto the streets of Vancouver, Canada through anomalies in time.	
Kira Nerys	Nana Visitor	Star Trek: Deep Space Nine	Kira's Mirror Universe counterpart, Intendant Kira, is shown surrounded by a mixed-gender harem. She's eventually depicted being in a romantic relationship with her universe's Ezri Tigan.	
Nicki	Nicola Reynolds	Ideal	She and Moz have a love/hate relationship, at some point she gets involved with Sangita, but goes back to Moz.	
Dr. Eleanor O'Hara	Eve Best	Nurse Jackie	A doctor.	
Clara Oswald/Oswin Oswald	Jenna Coleman	Doctor Who	In episode "Into the Dalek", she was in a relationship with Danny Pink, and in others she indicated attraction towards the male incarnations of The Doctor (eps. "Eleventh", "The Time of the Doctor", "Twelfth", "Deep Breath"). In episode "The Magician's Apprentice", she has an implied off-screen romance with Jane Austen, whom she refers to later as a "phenomenal kisser". A further implied reference occurs in episode "Face the Raven", in which she says about Austen, "I love her. Take that how you like." In the narrative of the series, Clara is "fragmented" through time and space. One of these fragments is named Oswin Oswald. In the episode "Asylum of the Daleks" (series 7), Oswin says to Rory Williams, "First boy I ever fancied was called Rory...actually, she was called Nina. I was going through a phase."	
Dexadrine "Dex" Parios	Cobie Smulders	Stumptown	A private investigator and veterans who has a problem with gambling.	
Valencia Perez	Gabrielle Ruiz	Crazy Ex-Girlfriend	At the beginning of the series, Valencia is dating a man (Josh Chan); later in the series she has a relationship with and becomes engaged to a woman (Beth).	
Lindsay Peterson	Thea Gill	Queer as Folk (US)	Lindsay is in a partner relationship with Melanie Marcus, but had an affair with a man, Sam Auerbach, in season 4. She and Melanie break up because of it, but reconcile in season 5.	
Anya Petrova/The Whisperer (aka Jenny Franklin)	Stasya Miloslavskaya (Margarita Levieva)	In From the Cold	A Russian spy and assassin. Romances Faina Orlov so as to get access to her father, but she develops feelings for Faina. Later, while living in the United States under the identity of Jenny Franklin, she marries a man and has a daughter with him.	
Sarah Pfefferman	Amy Landecker	Transparent	Sarah was married to a man, and was briefly engaged to a woman. She describes herself as bisexual throughout the third season.	
Brittany S. Pierce	Heather Morris	Glee	Was in a long-term relationship with Santana, which culminated in a marriage, and had romantic relationships with Artie Abrams and Sam Evans through the series.	
Naomi Pierce	Annabelle Dexter-Jones	Succession	Heiress to the Pierce Media empire, she is stated to have slept with Tabitha, another woman, and later goes on to date Kendall Roy.	
Sidney Pierce	Sophie Cookson	Gypsy	Ex-girlfriend of one of Jean Holloway's male patients, she becomes sexually involved with her.	
Alice Pieszecki	Leisha Hailey	The L Word The L Word: Generation Q	She has had relationships and hookups with men and women.	
Eve Polastri	Sandra Oh	Killing Eve	Is married to Niko, and develops an attraction (and obsession) with the assassin Villanelle.	
Natacha Rambova	Alexandra Daddario	American Horror Story: Hotel	She and her husband Rudolph Valentino were both involved in a polyamorous relationship with the young Elizabeth Johnson.	
Mona Ramsey	Chloe Webb	Tales of the City	Mona is a hippie.	
Scylla Ramshorn	Amalia Holm	Motherland: Fort Salem	A member of the anti-government faction, the Spree. In a relationship with Raelle Collar.	
Lenora Rauch	Maria Schrader	Deutschland 86	She's openly bisexual.	
Amy Raudenfeld	Rita Volk	Faking It	After Amy and her best friend Karma pretend to be in a lesbian relationship Amy realises she does in fact love Karma and begins to question her sexuality. Throughout the series she dates both men and women before entering a relationship with her childhood friend Sabrina.	
Mary Read	Rachel House	Our Flag Means Death	Based on the real-life bisexual pirate Mary Read, she is in a long-term relationship with Anne Bonny, and alludes to being attracted to men.	
Christine Reade	Riley Keough	The Girlfriend Experience	Christine is an attorney in training who leads a double life as a high-end sex worker. She has been involved with Avery Suhr and David Tellis.	
Shannon Reed	Isla Fisher	Home and Away	A woman who has a relationship with a man and a crush on her female mentor.	
Evelyn Rey	Nora Arnezeder	Origin	Rey mentioned that she once had a relationship with a woman. She has also had a relationship with a man.	
Kenya Rosewater	Mia Kirschner	Defiance	Kenya runs the town's bar and brothel.	
Susan Ross	Heidi Swedberg	Seinfeld	Ex-girlfriend of George who died from toxic glue on an envelope. After she'd broken up with him, she dated a woman, and then returned to George later.	
Susie Ross	Tina Landini	Family Affairs	Susie breaks people's hearts.	
Harper Row	Fallon Smythe	Gotham Knights	A teenager from Gotham City, Harper had to run away from her father who abused her because of her bisexuality.	
Ramona Royale	Angela Bassett	American Horror Story: Hotel	Was involved in a decade long relationship with the Countess but later left her for a rapper named Prophet Moses.	
Alex Russo	Selena Gomez	Wizards of Waverly Place	Showrunner Peter Murrieta confirmed in 2023 that Alex was bisexual and he wanted to do more with Alex and Stevie's relationship, but they weren't allowed to do so at the time.	
Sophia Russo	Kelli Giddish	The Good Wife	A private investigator, Sophia is married (to a man) and is lovers with Kalinda Sharma.	
Ryn	Eline Powell	Siren	Ryn, a mermaid, is attracted to Maddie. She has also shown interest in Ben, Maddie's boyfriend. She later forms a polyamorous triad with Ben and Maddie.	
Ellaria Sand	Indira Varma	Game of Thrones	She is the paramour to Oberyn Martell and mother to several of his bastard daughters, the Sand Snakes, later sent into deep mourning after the death of her lover.	
Toshiko Sato	Naoko Mori	Doctor Who Torchwood	An East Asian computer expert, she dated and slept with a woman (Mary) in Torchwood episode "Greeks Bearing Gifts" (2x07), and had mutual romantic feelings for Owen Harper.	
Madeline Scott	Rachelle Lefevre	Proven Innocent	Madeline is a lawyer specializing in wrongful convictions. She spent ten years in prison for a murder she did not commit.	
Inara Serra	Morena Baccarin	Firefly	Known as a Companion, she's a courtesan for upper-class clients and dignitaries, male or female.	
Ana Servín	Ludwika Paleta	Madre Solo Hay Dos		
Seven of Nine	Jeri Ryan	Star Trek: Voyager; Star Trek: Picard	She develops a relationship with Raffi, a female Starfleet officer, in Star Trek: Picard. She was confirmed by Jeri Ryan to be canonically bisexual.	
Jenny Schecter	Mia Kirshner	The L Word	Was in a relationship with Tim at the beginning of the series but has relationships with women the rest of the series.	
Bärbel Schmied	Meike Droste (de)	Mord mit Aussicht	Bärbel falls in love with Mathilde, which confuses her as she is not a lesbian. The two have a short affair. After this, Bärbel only dates men.	
Kalinda Sharma	Archie Panjabi	The Good Wife	Has an ex-husband, dates Cary, and has been involved with female lovers (Lana Delaney, Sophia Russo).	
Carson Shaw	Abbi Jacobson	A League of Their Own	She is married to Charlie, but is also attracted to Greta, a fellow baseball player.	
Sameen Shaw	Sarah Shahi	Person of Interest	Shaw is a skilled assassin and former government operative first introduced in Season 2.	
Eleanor Shellstrop	Kristen Bell	The Good Place	In "Michael's Gambit", the final episode of season 1, she describes Tahani Al-Jamil as "a hot, rich fraud with legs for days", then adds "Side note, I might legit be into Tahani." There is also a moment is Season 4 where she assures Chidi that she will always choose him as a romantic partner unless Frida Kahlo shows up.	
Izzy Silva	Priscilla Faia	You Me Her	Izzy is a grad student and escort who is hired by Jack Trakarsky and later by his wife, Emma. At the end of season 1, the three of them form a polyamorous triad.	
Ella Simms	Katie Cassidy	Melrose Place 2.0	A regular character in the series.	
Number Six	Tricia Helfer	Battlestar Galactica	Cylon "Number Six" and her clone variants were shown having sexual relationships with both male and female characters.	
Astrid Sloan	Lucy Boynton	The Politician	Astrid describes herself and her boyfriend River Barkley as 'kinda fluid', and enegages in a threeway with River and his male lover Payton Hobart. After River's death she has a brief sexual relationship with a man named Ricardo and also engages in a short term polyamorous relationship with Payton and his girlfriend Alice Charles.	
Petra Solano	Yael Grobglas	Jane the Virgin	In early seasons, Petra is in relationships with men, including Rafael Solano, but falls in love with a woman in season 4.	
River Song	Alex Kingston	Doctor Who	Showrunner and executive producer Steven Moffat confirmed that River is bisexual. In the episode "The Wedding of River Song" (06x13), she marries The Doctor. Cleopatra was River's first wife.	
Katherine "Kitty" Song-Covey	Anna Cathcart	XO, Kitty	Kitty has a boyfriend at the beginning of the show, and develops a crush on her female friend Yuri during the first season.	
Brook Soso	Kimiko Glenn	Orange Is the New Black	Has dated men in the past, and is seduced by Nicky after arriving in prison. She later has a relationship with Poussey.	
Zelda Spellman	Miranda Otto	Chilling Adventures of Sabrina	In the first season Zelda began an affair with her colleague Faustus Blackwood and eventually married him after the death of his wife. She later separated from her husband and began a relationship with Marie LeFleur.	
Ali Spencer	Kelli Hollis	Emmerdale	The mother of Amelia and Sean Spencer who leaves her husband, Dan, and flat on the Hotten estate for a new start in the village with her children and her girlfriend, Ruby Haswell.	
Olivia Spencer	Crystal Chappell	Guiding Light	Olivia Spencer had been married five times, and also had romantic feelings for Natalia.	
Lucy Spiller	Courteney Cox	Dirt	Although she has always dated men, she had a sexual relationship with her friend Tina Harrod.	
Maya St. Germain	Bianca Lawson	Pretty Little Liars	Was romantically involved with Emily Fields.	
June Stahl	Ally Walker	Sons of Anarchy	Love interest of Amy Tyler.	
Helen Stewart	Simone Lahbib	Bad Girls	Engaged to a man at the beginning of series 1, but forms a relationship with prisoner Nikki Wade.	
Jacqueline Stewart	Janine Duvitski	Benidorm	Jacqueline is a swinger, and with her husband con a free stay out of the resort.	
Vignette Stonemoss	Cara Delevingne	Carnival Row	In the past, Vignette was in a relationship with Tourmaline Larou. She and Tourmaline have remained close friends.	
Susan	Hilary Jardine	Van Helsing	Susan had an abusive boyfriend when the series began. In episode 1.09 she kisses her friend Vanessa (Van) Helsing on the lips and attempts physical intimacy with her.	
Anna Taggaro	Daniella Alonso	One Tree Hill	Anna was the first LGBT character to be introduced onto the show.	
Kat Tamin	Jamie Gray Hyder	Law & Order SVU	Casual coming out. First regular character in ten seasons that is not heterosexual. (Part of diversification of SVU.)	
Tamsin	Rachel Skarsten	Lost Girl	After she is done with him she shares a male one night stand with Bo, then initiates a friends with benefits relationship with her in Season 5.	
Tanis	Kaniehtiio Horn	Letterkenny	She has a flirtatious and ultimately sexual relationship with Wayne. In season 5 episode 2 ("The Ol' College Try") she saye to Wayne: "I swing both ways, you know. So if you ever wanted to bring a girl over, or a guy..."	
Rhaenyra Targaryen	Emma D'Arcy	House of the Dragon	She has had many male lovers, most notably Criston Cole, Daemon Targaryen. In Season 2, however, she developed feelings for Mysaria and the two shared a passionate kiss.	
Stahma Tarr	Jaime Murray	Defiance	A woman.	
Marissa Tasker	Brittany Allen	All My Children	Divorce lawyer who had an ex-husband named JR and relationship with a woman named Bianca, and was killed by drunken JR at a party.	
Charity Tate	Emma Atkins	Emmerdale	Had a brief relationship with Zoe Tate but is generally represented as a 'man's woman' or 'femme fatale' and has had many more relationships with men and been married more than once.	
Adrianna Tate-Duncan	Jessica Lowndes	90210	She has had relationships with men (the most important with Navid) although she had an affair with a girl named Gia.	
Tina Tevetino	Izzie Steele	Dirk Gently's Holistic Detective Agency	Came out in Season 2, episode 3.	
Thea	Melissa Roxburgh	Valor	A CIA agent who had short-term relationships with both SSG Zoe Cho and CPT Leland Gallo.	
Jasmine Thomas	Jenna Coleman	Emmerdale	Kisses Debbie Dingle and comes to the realization that she likes girls and boys. Later Debbie and Jasmine break-up after the latter is put in jail for murder.	
Tara Thornton	Rutina Wesley	True Blood	As a human, Tara has relationships with Sam and Eggs. After being turned into a vampire, becomes involved with a woman named Naomi. Later, her relationship with her maker Pam becomes intimate as well.	
Number Three	Lucy Lawless	Battlestar Galactica	She stays behind in a toxic wasteland (formerly Earth) with her ancestors than be killed in outer space.	
Toni Topaz	Vanessa Morgan	Riverdale	Toni kissed Jughead, but later said she preferred girls. She then started a serious long-term relationship with Cheryl Blossom.	
Callie Torres	Sara Ramirez	Grey's Anatomy	She has had romances with men (Mark Sloan, George O'Malley) and women (Arizona Robbins, Erica Hahn, Penelope Blake). In season 4 she realizes she's bisexual. In the show's ninth season, Callie and Arizona raise a baby together.	
Emma Trakarsky	Rachel Blanchard	You Me Her	An architect, she is married to Jack Trakarsky and has a tryst with Izzy Silva. Afterward, she reveals to her husband that she hasd had relationships with women before. The three of them later form a polyamorous triad at the end of season 1. At the end of season 2, she gets back together with her ex-girlfriend.	
Gina Tribbiani	Drea de Matteo	Joey	In the Season 2 episode "Joey and the Holding Hands", it is implied that Gina may be bisexual.	
Vanessa van Helsing	Kelly Overton	Van Helsing	The protagonist of this series, she has an ex-husband named Gary, a relationship with a man named Theo, and a woman named Susan at different points in the series.	
Dutch Velders	Ruta Gedmintas	The Strain	Dutch had romantic feelings for Nikki Taylor and Vasiliy Fet, as well as engaging in sex with both.	
Nyssa-Vex	Wallis Day	Krypton	Nyssa was in a same-sex relationship in the past. (Those born in the House of Vex or marry into it use "Vex" as their surname.)	
Villanelle	Jodie Comer	Killing Eve	Villanelle is a psychopathic assassin.	
Karen Walker	Megan Mullally	Will & Grace	In the first run of the show, Karen is only shown to have on-screen relationships with men, though she sometimes flirts with women and makes joking comments about being bisexual. After the show's reboot, Karen and her husband Stan divorce after she cheats on him with his friend, government agent Malcolm Widmark. Karen then connects with a woman, Nikki, who works in the same building as Karen. After opening up to Nikki about her love problems, the two women kiss.	
Elise Wassermann	Clémence Poésy	The Tunnel	Elise has had sex with men based on an emotionally detached physical necessity. She had never experienced instinctual attraction for anyone until she met Eryka Klein, and falls in love with her (the first time Elise has felt this way about someone).	
Helena "H.G." Wells	Jaime Murray	Warehouse 13	In 2.11, Helena stated "many of my lovers were men". In the series' finale Myka reveals that Helena is dating a woman named Giselle.	
McAfee Westbrook	Laura Dreyfuss	The Politician	Throughout the series McAfee has relationships with men and women.	
Ilana Wexler	Ilana Glazer	Broad City	A free spirited 23-year-old and Abbi Abrams' best friend who often sleeps around with men and women equally, but has a steady relationship with a male dentist named Lincoln Rice, although she only wants the relationship to be "physical."	
Jodie Wilde	Montana Manning	Hollyoaks	She has dated various men and women like Texas and Dodger.	
Shaz Wiley	Lindsey Fawcett	Bad Girls	An inmate who dies in a fire caused by a fire in the aftermath of a bomb's explosion.	
Sheena Williams	Laura Rogers	Bad Girls	Has a child with her boyfriend but forms a relationship with fellow prisoner Pat Kerrigan and intends to stay with her even after release.	
Clarice Willow	Polly Walker	Caprica		
Ramona "Ray" Wilson	Ariane Labed	Trigonometry	Forms a polyamorous triad with Kieran and Gemma.	
Palmer Wyland	Jaime King	The Class	Ex-firlfriend of Ethan and had a former crush on Kat.	
Xena	Lucy Lawless	Xena: Warrior Princess	She loved Gabrielle.	
Jacqueline "Jax" Zhou	Priscilla Quintana	Pandora	Involved with Xander Duvall. Has also been involved with Cordelia Fried and Aleka.	
Aleksandra Zimińska	Marta Wierzbicka	Na Wspólnej	Aleksandra is in a romantic relationship with Klaudia Bracka. (Na Wspólnej is a popular Polish soap opera. Aleksandra is probably the only bisexual notable character in contemporary Polish pop culture.	

== Men ==
Character	Portrayed by	Program	Notes	Ref(s)
Adric	Matthew Waterhouse	Doctor Who	Confirmed to have had male and female romantic interests and partners in supplementary material.	
Baron Afanas	Doug Jones	What We Do in the Shadows	The Baron has had secret affairs with both Nadja and Laszlo.	
Adam Eduardo Alvaro	Tyler Posey	Jane the Virgin	In season 4 episode 5, he reveals to Jane that he is bisexual. He later decides to move to Los Angeles for a job when they offer him a bigger salary.	
Jez Andrews	Lloyd Everitt	Casualty	Jez joined the series in 2016 and was characterised as a "young, ludicrously handsome and very openly bisexual" paramedic.	
Baum Arndt	Philipp Christopher	Origin	He had a relationship with a man and a woman.	
Nathaniel Baltimore	Hugh Davidson	Saul of the Mole Men	Hated rival of Saul.	
Magnus Bane	Harry Shum, Jr.	Shadowhunters	Explicitly states interest in both men and women in the episode "Of Men and Angels," then proceeded to show interest in starting a relationship with one of the main male characters (Alec Lightwood). They officially started a relationship in Episode 6 of Season 2 and were established to be in love in Episode 10 of the same season, when they exchanged "I love yous". He's had romantic relationships with women before, with the vampire Camille Belcourt being the one that stings the most.	
Tyler Barrol	Ashton Holmes	Revenge	He dates Ashley Davenport but later seduces Nolan Ross.	
Chuck Bass	Ed Westwick	Gossip Girl	Chuck has many sexual encounters in the show, mainly with women. He seduces and kisses a man as part of a sex game that he played with his girlfriend Blair, when she asks how he feels about kissing a man, Chuck responds, "Do you think I've never kissed a guy before?".	
Tim Bayliss	Kyle Secor	Homicide: Life on the Street	In the first episode concerning the matter he flatly stated he was "not gay" and did not formally declare himself to be bisexual until Season 7, but even then he did not want to be deemed "a crusader". This way of treating his sexuality is believed to have made the network uncomfortable.	
Steven Beale	Aaron Sidwell	EastEnders	The buildup to Steven's 2008 exit involved in a love triangle among him, Stacey, and Christian Clarke. He returned in 2016 with a girlfriend, Lauren Branning.	
Tobias Beecher	Lee Tergesen	Oz	He had a wife and then has a relationship with his female lawyer; while in prison he has a relationship with Chris Keller and a few sexual encounters with other inmates.	
Ben	David Quirk	Please Like Me	Ben is a one-night stand of Josh's during the initial stages of his open relationship with Arnold. Ben is later hospitalized, facing a possibly life-threatening surgery, causing a dilemma for Josh as to whether or not it is appropriate to visit him. Josh ends up doing so, which frustrates Arnold and creates the defining rift in their relationship. Josh later tries to get back in contact with Ben, but he has begun a relationship with a woman.	
Leopoldo "Polo" Benavent Villada	Álvaro Rico	Elite	Polo began experimenting with his sexuality when he was still in a relationship with Carla, and eventually discovered that he was bisexual.	
Wolfgang Bogdanow	Max Riemelt	Sense8	In season finale, is shown to be engaging in a threesome with Kala and her husband, Rajan.	
Oscar Branning	Pierre Counihan-Moullier	EastEnders	Establishes a relationship with Jasmine Fisher that leads to love triangle with Jasmine's brother.	
Evan "Buck" Buckley	Oliver Stark	9-1-1	In Season 7, Episode 4, Buck struggles with jealousy towards his best friend Eddie Diaz, and his new friend Tommy Kinard (a returning character). At the end of the episode, Tommy visits Buck and they kiss and set up a date. (Actor Oliver Stark confirmed in an interview that Buck is bisexual.)	
Suni Bulsara	Rahul Arya	Doctors	Upon his hiring at the Mill Health Centre, he flirts with Luca McIntyre and Scarlett Kiernan; Luca learns that he is a closeted bisexual.	
Lockie Campbell	Nick Rhys	Hollyoaks	During his marriage to Porsche McQueen, her cousin John Paul reveals that Lockie is bisexual and has been coming on to him. Porsche doesn't care and still marries him.	
Cassidy	Joe Gilgun	Preacher	Although mostly attracted to women, Cassidy makes several comments throughout the series about having sex with men, usually under the influence of drugs. In season 3 he kisses and shows attraction towards Eccarius, indicating that their relationship will be more than platonic.	
Castiel	Misha Collins	Supernatural	Castiel flirts with and kisses Meg, has sex with April, and in Meet The New Boss states, "I'm utterly indifferent to sexual orientation." In his final moments of the Season 15 episode "Despair," Castiel confesses his love for Dean.	
Ethan Chandler	Josh Hartnett	Penny Dreadful	Has a "romantic encounter" with Dorian Gray. (Showrunner John Logan perceives sexuality as fluid and has implied that all characters could potentially be depicted as such.)	
Keith Charles	Mathew St. Patrick	Six Feet Under	Keith's relationship with David is off and on, during one of their "off" times, Keith has a brief fling with pop star Celeste.	
Oscar Cherniak	Shawn Erker	Renegadepress.com	Oscar has been open and honest about his bisexuality to his girlfriend Patti, but still finds the relationship facing challenges.	
Angelo Colasanto	Daniele Favilli	Torchwood	Has a tryst with Captain Jack Harkness in the 1920s.	
Quentin Coldwater	Jason Ralph	The Magicians	Dates Alice Quinn in season 1, and falls in love with Eliot Waugh in season 3.	
John Constantine	Matt Ryan	Constantine Legends of Tomorrow	Constantine is a self-styled "master of the dark arts," who had sex with Sara Lance, reminisces to a past relationship with Desmond Laveau, and kissed Gary Green.	
Tim Cornish	Lee Williams	No Night Is Too Long	Tim is a college student who begins a relationship with his teacher Dr. Ivo Steadman, and he is also involved with Isabel Winwood at the same time.	
Laszlo Cravensworth	Matt Berry	What We Do in the Shadows	Is married to Nadja, and regularly sleeps with men, including Nandor.	
Beauchamp Day	Thomas Gibson	Tales of the City	Beauchamp seduces both Mary Ann and Jon, who, unbeknownst to Beauchamp, is his wife's gynecologist.	
Craig Dean	Guy Burnet	Hollyoaks	Had an affair with John Paul McQueen while with girlfriend Sarah Barnes. He found it difficult to choose between them, admitting he loved them both.	
Logan Delos	Ben Barnes	Westworld	Logan has sex with two female hosts and one male host. On the same night that he flirts with a male guest, he also kisses a female host. He engages in an orgy with both sexes.	
Sonny Dhillon	Pal Aron	Coronation Street	Sonny's girlfriend finds out about his secret bi-sexual past, when he kisses Sean Tully.	
Rich Dotcom	Ennis Esmer	Blindspot	Rich likes to flirt with all the members of the team.	
Will Drake	Cheyenne Jackson	American Horror Story: Hotel	Initially self-identifies as gay, but he later reveals he is a closeted bisexual who fears the prejudice others have regarding bisexuality.	
Jeremiah Fisher	Gavin Casalegno	The Summer I Turned Pretty	Though Jeremiah mostly hooks up with women, he also experiments with men and is seen kissing another guy at a party.	
Morris Fischer	Joris Putman	Goede tijden, slechte tijden	He likes girls and boys and calls himself bisexual.	
Evan Frears	Brock Kelly	Days of Our Lives	Dated girlfriend Jordan Ridgeway and then dated boyfriend Sonny Kiriakis.	
Felix Gaeta	Alessandro Juliani	Battlestar Galactica		
Ferdinand "Ferdy" Garcia	Ramon Tikaram	This Life	A motorcycle dispatch rider who hooks up with Warren.	
Conrad Gates	Ben Price	Footballers' Wives	Captain of a football team and no one is "resistant to his charms" whether they are male or female.	
Will Graham	Hugh Dancy	Hannibal	While show runner Bryan Fuller initially described Will as heterosexual, he has confirmed that Will is in love with Hannibal. While describing Will and Hannibal's relationship, Fuller says: "You can have this intimate connection with somebody that then causes you to wonder where the lines of your own sexuality are. And we didn't quite broach the sexuality. It was certainly suggested, but the love is absolutely on the table. There is love between these two men, and confusion between these two men." He has also confirmed that the attraction between him and Hannibal is mutual.	
Gary Green	Adam Tsekhman	Legends of Tomorrow	Gary is a Time Bureau agent and Ava Sharpe's subordinate who has an implied relationship with John Constantine and a canonical interest in women.	
Adam Groff	Connor Swindells	Sex Education	In season 1, Adam is the school bully, and is dating Aimee. Adam beats up Eric Effiong on a regular basis, until eventually he realizes he is sexually attracted to Eric and he gives him oral sex.	
Michael Guerin	Michael Vlamis	Roswell, New Mexico	Michael has been in relationships with Alex and Maria.	
Henrik Hanssen	Guy Henry	Holby City	Hanssen has shown attraction to women such as Maja Johansson, Roxanna MacMillan, Sahira Shah, and Carole Copeland. He also expresses romantic interest in his male friend Russ Faber.	
Klaus Hargreeves	Robert Sheehan	The Umbrella Academy	Klaus falls in love with fellow soldier Dave after travelling back in time to the Vietnam War. In season 2, he is shown to have engaged in orgies with both men and women.	
Captain Jack Harkness	John Barrowman	Doctor Who Torchwood	He flirts with both Rose Tyler and the Doctor when he was introduced in Doctor Who. He has relationships with both women and men, including Ianto Jones, in Torchwood.	
Owen Harper	Burn Gorman	Torchwood	Had sexual relationships/interest in men (Colin, Mark Lynch) and women (Katie Russel, Gwen Cooper).	
Chad Harris-Crane	Donn Swaby & Charles Divins	Passions	Chad has been in relationships with Simone Russell and Vincent. (Passions made daytime history by being the first to depict two men having sex.)	
Larry Henderson	John Lithgow	Trial & Error	Larry has had a lover outside of his marriage.	
Payton Hobart	Ben Platt	The Politician	Initially identifies as straight and dates his classmate Alice Charles but develops a romantic relationship with his male classmate River Barkley and even has a threesome with River and his girlfriend Astrid Sloan. He and Alice later enter a short lived polyamorous relationship with Astrid before getting married.	
Saul Holden	Ron Rifkin	Brothers & Sisters	His bisexuality was revealed in the 2007–2008 season. Later in the show he struggled with it, after he had previously hidden it from his family. (According to GLAAD, he became "the first over-60 series regular LGBT character on broadcast television".)	
Miles Hollingsworth III	Eric Osborne	Degrassi: The Next Generation & Degrassi: Next Class	Has had romantic relationships with females, and one male. Though he was hesitant to label himself, he finally comes to terms with his sexuality and comes out as bisexual in the fourth season.	
Stewy Hosseini	Arian Moayed	Succession	A private equity investor and long-time friend of Kendall Roy. He is seen dating women but is said to also "kiss guys on Molly".	
Nolan Hotchkiss	Chris Mason	Pretty Little Liars: The Perfectionists	A bad boy and leaders of the Perfectionists.	
Tony Hills	Mark Homer	EastEnders	Tony had numerous relationships with men and women; most notably with Tiffany and then with her brother Simon.	
Jake	Steve Lund	Schitt's Creek	Jake dates both Stevie and David simultaneously. When he proposes a throuple, Stevie and David both run.	
Jaskier	Joey Batey	The Witcher	Joey Batey, involved in the writing of Jaskier and Radovid's romance, officially identified Jaskier as being a panromantic pansexual character, and explained that he doesn't believe that Jaskier really sees gender; instead developing a sapioromantic and sapiosexual connection with Prince Radovid. However, as soon as it was confirmed that his new romantic interest would be a man, virtually all media outlets announced that Jaskier's long-suspected bisexuality was now official (given that some consider pansexuality to be part of the bisexual spectrum), and he's often referred to as bisexual by journalists and fandom members. In the series, one of his lovers describes him as "chasing tail of every kind. Men, women, dwarves, elves, polymorphous..."	
Dale Jennings	Sam Reid	The Newsreader	Dale begins a relationship with news presenter Helen Norville while also developing a crush on cameraman Tim Ahern.	
Ianto Jones	Gareth David-Lloyd	Torchwood	Has a secret relationship with a woman at the beginning of the show, then later starts a relationship with main character Jack Harkness, a bisexual captain, later dying in a miniseries.	
Ivan Jones	Daniel Brocklebank	Emmerdale	A dustman.	
Robert Karow	Mark Waschke	Tatort	Protagonist and investigating chief inspector in the episodes that are set in Berlin.	
Christopher "Chris" Keller	Christopher Meloni	Oz	Has a relationship with a male inmate named Tobias Beecher, and is a serial killer who preys upon gay men in the outside world while hiding his sexual orientation through a series of marriages.	
Jim Lahey	John Dunsworth	Trailer Park Boys	Jim is a drunk, trailer-park supervisor.	
Lestat de Lioncourt	Sam Reid	Interview with the Vampire	Lestat has had relationships with men and women. In multiple episodes he is seen in sexual relationships with both.	
Danny Lomax	Stephen Billington	Hollyoaks	Danny publicly comes out as bisexual in one episode.	
Joe MacMillan	Lee Pace	Halt and Catch Fire	Joe has multiple relationships with men and women throughout the series.	
Mark	Luke Bilyk	Lost Girl	Mark is shown as being attracted to females and has sex with Bo Dennis, then as his friendship with Vex grows their relationship becomes romantic.	
Oberyn Martell	Pedro Pascal	Game of Thrones	Prince Oberyn Martell, also known as the Red Viper, was a member of House Martell, the ruling family of Dorne. He is bisexual and has eight illegitimate daughters, collectively known as the "Sand Snakes".	
Gael Martinez	Tommy Martinez	Good Trouble	A socially conscious and politically active graphic designer who has a relationship with Callie Adams Foster and later gets in a relationship with a man named Bryan.	
Moose Mason	Cody Kearsley	Riverdale	Moose is a student at Riverdale High School, and has a relationship with Kevin Keller.	
Massimo	Luca Argentero	The Ignorant Angels	Massimo was the husband of Antonia while having an affair with homosexual man Michele.	
James McGraw / Captain James Flint	Toby Stephens	Black Sails	As young Lieutenant McGraw, he got to know Thomas Hamilton and his wife, Miranda, the three of them started having an affair.	
Malakai Mitchell	Thomas Weatherall	Heartbreak High	Malakai was in a relationship with Amerie, but they broke up. He temporarily dated Rowan. He came out in season 2, episode 3, "The Feelings Pit".	
Blake Moran	Erich Bergen	Madam Secretary	Blake is Elizabeth McCord's Executive Assistant. He comes out to her in season 3 episode 22, "Revelation".	
Lucifer Morningstar	Tom Ellis	Lucifer	He is seen having slept with both men and women. When he interviews people he has slept with to solve a case, both men and women are present.	
Nandor the Relentless	Kayvan Novak	What We Do in the Shadows	Nandor states that he had thirty-seven "wives" when he was alive, some of whom were men. He also regularly sleeps with Laszlo.	
Neal	Maulik Pancholy	Whitney	Whitney discovers Neal on a date with another man.	
Nick Nelson	Kit Connor	Heartstopper	During the show he grows to understand his sexuality. He had a crush on a girl named Tara Jones when he was younger and he also has a crush on Charlie Spring once he is in 11th year. Charlie notes that Nick might be bisexual, and after research, he figures out that he is bi. He comes out to his mother as in the eighth episode of the first season.	
Danny Pennant	Gary Lucy	EastEnders	Danny has relationships with men and women.	
Niles Pottinger	James Murray	Defiance	Mayor of Defiance, appointed as such by the Earth Republic.	
Todd Quinlan	Robert Maschio	Scrubs	Todd confides that he has had a threesome, meaning that it was two men and a woman. He also says that he appreciates hot regardless of gender.	
Randy	Patrick Roach	Trailer Park Boys	Randy is an unambitious man who smokes copious amounts of marijuana, constantly devours cheeseburgers and almost never wears a shirt.	
David Rose	Dan Levy	Schitt's Creek	Has relationships with Stevie, a woman, and also Jake and later Patrick. He describes his attraction in terms of wine: "I like the wine, not the label."	
Nolan Ross	Gabriel Mann	Revenge	He has dated men and women.	
Ravi Roy	Stephen Uppal	Hollyoaks	Ravi was dating Nancy Dean, but after he split with Nancy, he made a pass at Russ Owen. He tried to pass it off as a joke, but later admitted to Russ that he liked girls and guys.	
Ilya Rozanov	Connor Storrie	Heated Rivalry	Ilya has relationships with both men and women. While having a passionate relationship with his hockey rival Shane Hollander, he also has a casual relationship with his friend Svetlana Vetrova.	
Rudy	French Stewart	Mom	Chef Rudy was revealed as bisexual in the 2013-2014 broadcast season.	
Ricky Schwartz	Matthew Fahey	Awkward	The ex-boyfriend of Tamara, who later reappears as a ghost.	
Grayson Sinclair	Christopher Villiers	Emmerdale	Grayson is currently married to a woman named Perdy but previously had a relationship with a man named Paul.	
Eric Slater	Tom Courtenay	Unforgotten	Eric was in a heterosexual marriage and had secret Gay relationships with Jimmy Sullivan and another man called Nicholas (the latter is seen only in a photograph).	
Christopher "Chris" Smith/Peacemaker	John Cena	Peacemaker	Sleeps with women and alludes to sleeping with men. In the final battle with his father, White Dragon, the latter lists his son's bisexuality as one of the reasons that he hates him.	
Robert Spearing	Harry Lawtey	Industry	Robert has sex with women and men.	
Leo Spiller	Will McCormack	Dirt	Leo is the brother of the show's main character, tabloid editor Lucy Spiller.	
Marcus Standish	Joe Morton	The Politician	For over ten years Marcus and his wife Dede were involved in a polyamorous relationship with a man named William Ward, although William dumps them after falling in love with another woman. Marcus and Dede briefly engage in a sexual relationship with a different man before dumping him and divorcing each other.	
Charlie St. George	Tyler Barnhardt	13 Reasons Why	Charlie comes out to his father when he starts dating his classmate Alex Standall.	
Tony Stonem	Nicholas Hoult	Skins	He's in a relationship at the beginning with Michelle (he cheats on her with other women), but in an episode he shows sexual curiosity for his friend Maxxie Oliver.	
Victor Strand	Colman Domingo	Fear the Walking Dead	Confirmed bisexual by the actor.	
Robert Sugden	Ryan Hawley	Emmerdale	Robert starts having an affair with Aaron Dingle while engaged to Chrissie White. Their affair is exposed as Robert is outed, his marriage to Chrissie ends as him and Aaron enter into a relationship. Robert later confirms his bisexuality to Aaron expressing he had kept it hidden since being a teenager when his father had beat him for it.	
Brett Talbot	Cody Saintgnue	Teen Wolf	Old school rival of Liam Dunbar.	
Dell Toledo	Michael Chiklis	American Horror Story: Freak Show	He had relations with Ethel Darling and Desiree Dupree, but he was in love with a hustler named Andy.	
Paul Torres	Adan Canto	The Following	Lived with a man named Jacob but also had attractions toward women.	
Jeremy Usborne	Robert Webb	Peep Show	Hinted in earlier series', and confirmed in Series 9 in episodes 'Gregory's Beard' and 'Threeism', where Jeremy starts an affair with his current girlfriend Megan's boyfriend Joe, and discusses his sexuality openly with roommate Mark Corrigan.	
Harry Vanderspeigle	Alan Tudyk	Resident Alien	Harry is an alien of a genderless species. Before coming to earth in the form of a human male, he had a close bond with another such alien, who he calls his wife. Throughout the series, he shows romantic interest in female characters. Season 2 establishes that he watched the movie E.T. the Extra-Terrestrial and was sexually attracted to the titular protagonist. (His sexuality is never labeled.)	
Kash Varma	Bilal Hasna	Extraordinary	Kash has romantic relationships with both Carrie and Clark.	
Vex	Paul Amos	Lost Girl	BDSM submissive with a favorite dominatrix in Season 2, he has a sexual fantasy involving Mark in Season 5 and the two of them become a couple.	
William Ward	Teddy Sears	The Politician	For over ten years Teddy was engaged in a polyamorous relationship with married couple Marcus and Dede Standish, but eventually leaves them for a woman named Hadassah Gold.	
Tyrell Wellick	Martin Wallström	Mr. Robot	Tyrell's sexuality has never been explicitly stated, but he often uses sex to reach his goals and seems pretty comfortable kissing and performing sex acts with both women and men, like Anwar in the show's third episode. He has a wife with whom he is implied to be sexually active in the first season of the show, and confesses his love for the main character of the show, Elliot Alderson, who is a man, in the second season. It has been confirmed by the show creator Sam Esmail that he does indeed love Elliot.	
Darryl Whitefeather	Pete Gardner	Crazy Ex-Girlfriend	He married a woman but after their separation is dating "White Josh", even singing a song declaring himself bisexual titled, "Getting Bi." In the final season he marries a woman again.	
Jackson Whittemore	Colton Haynes	Teen Wolf	Jackson was in a relationship with girlfriend Lydia Martin from seasons 1 to 3 before moving to London. Jackson returned to season 6 with his boyfriend Ethan.	
Ulysses Zane	Avan Jogia	Now Apocalypse	Ulysses describes himself as a "Kinsey four".	
Zero	Adam Senn	Hit the Floor	Senn, who is also a widely known fashion model describes his character, Zero, as a "bisexual sociopath."	

== Non-binary bisexuals ==
Character	Portrayed by	Program	Notes	Ref(s)
Carlos Cervantez	Jojo Fleites	The Winchesters	Carlos is a bisexual, non-binary demon hunter.	
Jim Jimenez	Vico Ortiz	Our Flag Means Death	Jim is a bisexual, non-binary skilled fighter and pirate who has shown interest in both men and women throughout the series.	
Loki Laufeyson	Tom Hiddleston	Loki	Loki is a bisexual, non-binary (although he's exclusively referred to with masculine language) shapeshifting god of mischief who has had relationships with men and women. When Sylvie asks him about his romantic involvements and if it perhaps included another prince Loki replies, "A bit of both." He is referred to as "gender fluid" by series director Kate Herron.	
Jordan Li	London Thor; Derek Luh	Gen V	Jordan is a bisexual, non-binary gender-shifter. After being injected with Compound V, Jordan developed the power to change genders at will.	

== See also ==
- List of feature films with bisexual characters
- List of fictional bisexual characters
- List of lesbian characters in television
- List of gay characters in television
- List of dramatic television series with LGBT characters: 1960s–2000s
- List of dramatic television series with LGBT characters: 2010–2015
- List of dramatic television series with LGBT characters: 2016–2019
- List of dramatic television series with LGBT characters: 2020s
- List of comedy television series with LGBT characters
- List of LGBT characters in soap operas
- List of reality television programs with LGBT cast members
- Lists of LGBT figures in fiction and myth
- Lists of bisexual people
