= Jarrid Geduld =

South African actor

- Born: 13 January 1990 (age 36); Cape Town, South Africa
- Occupations: Actor, DIRECTOR
- Years active: 2004–present
- Height: 1.6 m (5 ft 3 in)
- Parents: DONOVAN GEDULD (father); NORMA GEDULD (mother)
- Relatives: KEERAN GEDULD, NICHOLA GEDULD
- Awards: SAFTA AWARD BEST ACTOR 2019, SILWERSKERM AWARD BEST ACTOR 2018, AFRICAN ACADEMY AWARD BEST SUPPORTING ACTOR 2019, TAORMINA BEST ACTOR AWARD 2019, SAFTA AWARD BEST ACTOR 2023, SAFTA NOMINATION BEST DIRECTING TEAM ARENDSVLEI 2023

Jarrid Geduld (born 13 January 1990) is a South African actor. He is best known for his roles in the popular films 10,000 BC, Ellen: Die storie van Ellen Pakkies and Boy Called Twist.

== Personal life ==
He was born on 13 January 1990 in South Africa.

== Career ==
In 2004, he made his film debut with the film Boy Called Twist and played the titular role as a child artist. Then in 2005, he appeared in two films: The Flyer and Interrogation Room. In 2013, he was nominated for the Most Popular Actor of the Year Award at the South Africa India Film and Television Awards for his role in the film Lucky Man.

In 2018, he played the role 'Abie Pakkies' in the film Ellen: Die storie van Ellen Pakkies. The film became a blockbuster and received critical acclaim. In 2018, he received the Award for the Best Actor at the Silwerskerm Film Festival for his role. Then in 2019, at the South African Film and Television Awards, he won the SAFTA Golden Horn Award for the Best Actor in a Feature Film for his role in this film. In the same year, he won the Award for the Best Actor in a Supporting Role at 15th Africa Movie Academy Awards.

== Filmography ==
Year	Film	Role	Genre	Ref.
2004	Boy Called Twist	Twist	Film	
2005	The Flyer	Kieren Junior	Film	
2005	Interrogation Room	Peter	TV movie	
2011	The Borrowers	Borrower lad	TV movie	
2011	Watch Your Back	Ernest "lastag" Solomon	Film	
2012	Lucky Man		Film	
2013	Zulu	Cat's Man No. 1	Film	
2013	Four Corners	Drug score	Film	
2014	Black Sails	Crisp	TV series	
2015	Lina and Leo, 2015	David	Short film	
2016	The Brothers Grimsby	Drug dealer	Film	
2016	Honey 3: Dare to Dance	Construction Worker	Home movie	
2016	The Whale Caller	Denizen	Film	
2018	Ellen: The Ellen Pakkies Story	Abie Pakkies	Film	
2018	Number 37	Brendan's Voice	Film	
2018	Order of the Dragon	Peter	TV movie	
2019	Dwaalster	Randall	TV series	
2020	Projek Dina	Brandon	TV series	
2020	Arendsvlei	Gavin "Bompie" Gelant	TV series	
2022	Indemnity	Theo Abrams	Film	
