= VIII (disambiguation) =

VIII is the Roman numeral for the number 8.

VIII could also refer to:

- VIII., an episode of the TV series Black Sails
- VIII (Severe), a level on the Modified Mercalli intensity scale
