= Garth Breytenbach =

South African actor

- Born: June 14, 1979 (age 46); Cape Town, South Africa
- Occupation: Actor
- Years active: 1993–present
- Height: 1.9 m (6 ft 3 in)

Garth Breytenbach (born 14 June 1979) is a South African actor. He is best known for the roles in the films Five Fingers for Marseilles, Beyond the River and Mandela: Long Walk to Freedom.

== Personal life ==
He was born in Cape Town, South Africa. He worked in London, pursuing a career in the hospitality industry. However, he later moved into acting and film. He graduated from the CityVarsity School of Media Studies, Cape Town. He then attended the Creative Arts College, completing a Diploma in Acting for Camera.

== Career ==
His passion for acting came when he attended the theatres in Cape Town and the Grahamstown Arts Festival. Breytenbach made his screen debut in 1993 with the popular South African television serial Generations. In this play, he appeared in the minor role of Jacques Venter. In 2005, he acted in the mini-series The Triangle directed by Craid R. Baxley. Then he played the popular Pvt. Slug Skinner in the 2008 direct-to-video film Starship Troopers 3: Marauder. Since 2014, he has appeared on mainstream television, acting on Black Sails and later in Deutschland 86 (2018).

In 2017, he starred in the mini-series Madiba and film Beyond The River. However his most popular role in 2017 came in the South African western thriller film Five Fingers For Marseilles, as Officer De Vries. In 2013, he appeared on the film Long Walk to Freedom opposite Idris Elba. In 2018, he played the role of Ajax, the Greek warrior in the BBC and Netflix mini-series Troy: Fall Of A City (2018).

He is also famous for his acting in historical dramas such as Mandela: Long Walk to Freedom, Winnie Mandela, Verraaiers and Goodbye Bafana. Apart from dramatic roles, Breytenbach also has featured in comedy roles, notably in the series Hammerhead TV, which includes the popular actors Bevan Cullinan, Brendan Jack and Chris Forrest.

== Partial filmography ==
Year	Film	Role	Genre	Ref.
2020	Raised by Wolves	Den	TV series	

== See also ==
- List of Black Sails characters
