= List of Black Sails episodes =

Black Sails is an American television drama series created by Jon Steinberg and Robert Levine for Starz that debuted on January 25, 2014. It was produced by Film Afrika Worldwide and Platinum Dunes. It was written as a prequel to Robert Louis Stevenson's novel Treasure Island. The series was renewed for a fourth season on July 31, 2015, approximately six months before the third season premiered. On July 20, 2016, Starz announced that the series' fourth season would be its last; the season premiered on January 29, 2017 and concluded on April 2, 2017. During the course of the series, 38 episodes of Black Sails aired over four seasons.

== Series overview ==
Season	Episodes	Originally released	
Season	Episodes	First released	Last released
1	8	January 25, 2014	March 15, 2014
2	10	January 24, 2015	March 28, 2015
3	10	January 23, 2016	March 26, 2016
4	10	January 29, 2017	April 2, 2017

== Episodes ==
=== Season 1 (2014) ===
No. overall	No. in season	Title	Directed by	Written by	Original release date	US viewers (millions)
1	1	"I."	Neil Marshall	Jonathan E. Steinberg & Robert Levine	January 25, 2014	0.846
Merchant sailor John Silver joins Captain Flint's crew as a cook after surviving an ambush by Flint's ship, Walrus; he secretly pockets a missing page from his former employer's logbook with information that the captain seeks. Meanwhile, Flint faces a potential mutiny from his crew over a lack of prize money and the threat of HMS Scarborough, a notorious pirate hunter. The Captain recruits his first mate Billy Bones to deal with a mutinous crewman, Singleton, and make an example of him to discourage rebellion. Meanwhile, Eleanor Guthrie tries to keep order on the lawless island of New Providence while conducting her father's business as the fence for turning the pirates ill-gotten booty into laundered cash, as the Royal Navy begins making plans to deal with the islanders once and for all.
2	2	"II."	Sam Miller	Jonathan E. Steinberg & Robert Levine	February 1, 2014	0.840
After Captain Flint reveals Singleton as the thief in front of his crew, he has Gates convince Billy, who knows the truth about his captain, that this is for the good of the crew. Meanwhile, Silver and Max are forced to hide in the brothel when they put themselves in danger as Captain Vane and his partners, Jack Rackham and Anne Bonny, are determined to get a hold of the missing page in the hunt for the Spanish galleon, Urca de Lima. Also, Eleanor is given an ultimatum by Max and has to decide between wealth or love.
3	3	"III."	Neil Marshall	Jonathan E. Steinberg & Robert Levine	February 8, 2014	0.671
Flint asks Gates to seek additional help from Captain Hornigold to borrow his ship, Royal Lion, in search of the Urca de Lima. Meanwhile, Silver and Billy tackle a morale problem while they work together on discovering who the remaining mutineers are. During a captain's meeting to strike a deal, Eleanor is impressed by Vane's voice of reason and calm demeanor, which leads to them having an intimate encounter. However, once she finds out Max was raped by his crew, she punishes Vane by giving them an ultimatum. Also, Gates is promoted from quartermaster to captaining his own ship.
4	4	"IV."	Sam Miller	Brad Caleb Kane	February 15, 2014	0.672
The Walrus suffers a disastrous undertaking when the crew takes on the mission of careening the ship's hull under the new quartermaster's orders. Meanwhile, Silver warns Flint about Billy's allegiance with Morley as the story of Mrs. Barlow comes to light. When Captain Bryson arrives in New Providence, Eleanor wants the 12 cannons aboard his supply ship, Andromache for protection in the search for the Urca de Lima. However, after he denies her, she turns to her father for help in persuading him despite betraying Mr. Scott's wishes. Also, Vane is surprised to see a figure from his past.
5	5	"V."	Marc Munden	Doris Egan	February 22, 2014	0.744
Flint and his crew of the Walrus play a deadly game of naval warfare when they engage Captain Bryson and the Andromache on the open sea to gain precious cargo. Meanwhile, Richard forces his daughter's hand when he makes an announcement to the locals about his assets being liquidated. This causes a mob to riot against Eleanor, who seeks help from Hornigold. Rackham makes a career change for him and Vane when they become owners of the brothel. Also, Billy questions Flint about Mrs. Barlow, and Anne confesses to Max about her past with men.
6	6	"VI."	T.J. Scott	Heather Bellson	March 1, 2014	0.847
Capturing the Andromache proves to be a costly endeavor when Flint loses a few of his crew to Bryson's men who are holed up in the hull. Meanwhile, Anne decides to take a stand against Hamund and his men for harming Max. Eleanor gets a visit from an unlikely ally who needs her help and turns to Silver to form a plan. Billy reads a private letter from Mrs. Barlow asking for a pardon for Flint's murderous actions aboard the Maria Aleyne, and asks Gates to confront him before the men learn of his betrayal. Vane reaches his destination from his self-made voyage.
7	7	"VII."	Marc Munden	Michael Angeli	March 8, 2014	0.703
Flint and Gates discuss Mrs. Barlow's letter after Billy's disappearance. Randall accuses Silver of being a thief in front of Dufresne, who is the new quartermaster. Eleanor suffers a loss when Mr. Scott wants nothing to do with her partnership with Flint and he becomes a part of Captain Hornigold's crew. Rackham is having trouble turning a profit at the brothel, so Max helps run the business. In need of a new crew, Captain Vane makes a deal with a man from his past to borrow his men, but ends up fighting a battle to the death.
8	8	"VIII."	T.J. Scott	Jonathan E. Steinberg & Robert Levine	March 15, 2014	0.762
The hunt for the Urca de Lima begins when Silver divulges the schedule to Flint, taking them to the ship's location. Rackham stops paying Ms. Mapleton, which causes her to threaten to blackmail Rackham. She threatens to tell the locals what really happened to Mr. Noonan. Meanwhile, Vane makes his way back to New Providence with his new crew. Eleanor's situation changes when a small band of men take over Hornigold's fort and start sinking supply ships in the bay. Gates threatens to call off the attack of the Ranger, so Flint kills him. The final scenes of the season show that the Walrus has beached itself upon the same isle as the Urca de Lima.

=== Season 2 (2015) ===
No. overall	No. in season	Title	Directed by	Written by	Original release date	US viewers (millions)
9	1	"IX."	Steve Boyum	Jonathan E. Steinberg & Robert Levine	January 24, 2015	0.860
The Walrus crew is stranded on the beach with an army of Spanish soldiers standing between them and the gold on the Urca de Lima. When going before his former crew to face judgment for his crimes, Flint devises a plan for survival to sneak aboard the warship and take out the watchmen. Thinking he means to escape, Silver volunteers to go on the mission. Meanwhile, Eleanor struggles to maintain her hold on Nassau as a new threat arrives; the murderous pirate Ned Low and his equally violent crew from his ship, Fancy. Also, Vane has a new position at the fort on New Providence, while Jack is reduced to being labelled a "crew-killer" and endures daily beatings.
10	2	"X."	Clark Johnson	Michael Chernuchin	January 31, 2015	0.746
A member of the Walrus crew unexpectedly returns, but finds himself cruelly tethered down on a beach. Flint, still stuck in the bowels of the ship, sets his plan in motion to become a captain in two days' time by offering advice to Dufresne on a certain route to navigate the galleon through. Meanwhile, Silver tries to make himself indispensable to his crewmates by reading them gossip that the quiet cook Randall witnesses daily aboard the ship. Meeks asks Eleanor to dispose of his captain, Ned Low since his unquenchable thirst for power is causing the crew to be reckless. After Jack learns about the intimate encounter between Max and Anne, he accepts it and later proposes his next money-making scheme with them.
11	3	"XI."	Stefan Schwartz	Brad Caleb Kane	February 7, 2015	0.691
When Flint returns to Nassau to seek help retrieving the gold, he encounters a problem when he learns that Hornigold no longer commands the fort on the island, and anchors the Spanish warship in the bay directly in line with it. No longer considered a "crew-killer," Rackham's reputation is restored, but he is worried that Anne is being taken advantage of by Max, driving a wedge between them. Later, Vane is confronted by Ned Low, who learns of his intimate relationship with Eleanor and threatens her well-being after being provoked. This causes Vane to take action and devise a plan to board Low's ship, kill him and steal his crew, but in the process, Vane discovers Low is carrying 'precious cargo' in the brig.
12	4	"XII."	Clark Johnson	Story by : Julie Siege; Teleplay by : Jonathan E. Steinberg & Dan Shotz	February 14, 2015	0.752
Wanting to remove Vane from the fort, Flint sends a messenger to him issuing a warning. Eleanor tries to put an end to Flint's plan to demolish the fort, giving him an ultimatum; however, the final decision rests in his hands only. Meanwhile, Vane learns that Low's special cargo is Abigail Ashe, daughter of Carolina's governor, and plots to ransom her off. Rackham admires what Max can do with the help of one of her ladies in order to gain him a ship and crew, making him a captain again. Silver, while ensuring his portion of the gold, makes use of his time on the island by playing to the locals with gossip, but in doing so, he is reunited with an old crew member from the Walrus who is badly malnourished.
13	5	"XIII."	Alik Sakharov	Aaron Helbing & Todd Helbing	February 21, 2015	0.750
Flint begins the bombardment of Vane's fort in earnest. After destroying a portion of the wall, Flint and Hornigold stage their crews on the beach, arming them to retake the fort. During the bombardment, it is shown through a series of flashbacks that not only had Flint wholly committed himself to Hamilton's plan to retake Nassau and pardon the pirates, but had also begun an affair with him. While seeking support from his commander, Flint is confronted by him and Lord Hamilton, who strip Flint of his rank and expel him from the Royal Navy. They give Flint and Ms. Hamilton until nightfall to flee London while committing Mr. Hamilton to a mental hospital. In the present, Ms. Hamilton, now Ms. Barlow, rides into town to try to avert the bloodshed of the coming battle. She finally gets Flint alone and tells him of Abigail Ashe, the daughter of a once-trusted friend. She says they should trade her for safety in the Colonies, thus finally making possible Mr. Hamilton's plan. She leaves Flint a copy of "Marcus Aurelius," which has a dedication to Flint by Mr. Hamilton. After she departs, Vane bursts into the room with a dagger.
14	6	"XIV."	Michael Nankin	Heather Bellson	February 28, 2015	0.778
To spare Flint exposure to his crew, Billy Bones decides to remain silent and not go ahead with his plans for revenge. However, he later states that he was captured and interrogated by the Royal Navy, and was given the option to denounce Flint for a pardon. Flint retracts his promises to capture the fort, kill Vane, and raid the Spanish gold so that he can regain a legitimate reputation by following Eleanor and Miranda's plan to return the daughter of the governor of Carolina. Jack Rackham finally takes on his maiden voyage as a captain, but it takes a turn for the worse when his ship is boarded by rival pirates, who have a stronger crew and heavier weaponry. They give Rackham the option of a sharing term, and due to the pitiful nature of it, Rackham decides to risk a confrontation with the rival captain.
15	7	"XV."	Alik Sakharov	Lisa Schultz Boyd	March 7, 2015	0.632
The pirates prepare to take a vote on whether Flint or Hornigold should become captain, causing Flint's plans to take a halt. Billy secretly meets with Dufresne and declares his plan to gather at least ten men that oppose Flint, to capture him and surrender him to the British authorities, so that they may all receive full pardons for their piracy. Two scouts tasked with watching the Urca gold return to report that the Spanish crew died from a tropical disease, leaving the gold unprotected. John, intercepting them, convinces them to tell Flint that the gold is now gone so that John can organize a secret expedition with Max to gather it without any issues or opposition. As part of the plan for pardons for Flint and Miranda, Eleanor betrays Vane by helping Abigail to escape.
16	8	"XVI."	Steve Boyum	Story by : Marc Berzenski & Maria Melnik; Teleplay by : Jonathan E. Steinberg & Robert Levine	March 14, 2015	0.743
Billy's trap to eliminate the traitors of the pirate crew succeeds, and Flint ends up winning against Hornigold in the election for the captaincy. After the election and its results against him, Hornigold departs from Nassau. Flint also leaves Nassau, but instead sails to Carolina to meet with the governor there in regards to his daughter; Carolina is a place where pirates are believed to be most evil and the attitude towards them is extremely hostile. John Silver discusses the plan for the retrieval of the unguarded Spanish gold with Jack Rackham and his crew. Mrs. Mapleton reveals to Eleanor the plan to retrieve the gold, and they both agree that the plan goes against the dream that they share for Nassau, to transform the pirate town into a legitimate community.
17	9	"XVII."	Lukas Ettlin	Story by : Dan Shotz; Teleplay by : Brad Caleb Kane	March 21, 2015	0.653
While Flint's ship waits in the Charles Town harbour, Vane overtakes the ship. However, Billy remains faithful to Flint's cause, and Silver remains on board, hiding with a few of the survivors. In Nassau, the remaining traitors that were not captured join forces to take Eleanor as hostage. They deliver her to the Royal Navy so that they can receive their ten full pardons for their actions as pirates. Flint prepares to accept the conditions of Peter Ashe, the Carolina governor, which are to expose his whole story to London and allow an inspection of the pirate port of Nassau. However, Miranda comes to the realization that it was Peter who betrayed them so many years ago. She retracts her deal with the governor and demands that Peter be hanged for his betrayal, leading to Peter's guards capturing Flint and killing Miranda. Flint's trial is later announced. Upon hearing the news of Flint's upcoming trial, Vane suggests an alliance with Billy to save Flint.
18	10	"XVIII."	Steve Boyum	Jonathan E. Steinberg & Robert Levine	March 28, 2015	0.668
In Charles Town, the day of Captain Flint's trial comes. Lord Ashe offers him a chance to avoid humiliation, but Flint declines, still bitter at Ashe for Mrs. Barlow's death. However, help for Flint arrives in the unlikeliest form: Charles Vane. Vane's men launch their attack on the city using its own cannons, and Flint and Vane fight their way out, with Flint murdering Ashe en route. They reach the ship to find Flint's crew have regained leadership, but Flint orders Vane's crew be released - realizing pirates have to unite against the rest of the world. Silver, after being tortured, is forced to have his leg amputated. When he finally awakens, he reveals that the spy they hired to watch the Spanish soldiers sold the location to Jack, but he leaves out his own part in the exchange. The ending scene shows Max celebrating Jack's success at bringing the treasure back to Nassau.

=== Season 3 (2016) ===
No. overall	No. in season	Title	Directed by	Written by	Original release date	US viewers (millions)
19	1	"XIX."	Alik Sakharov	Jonathan E. Steinberg & Robert Levine	January 23, 2016	0.843
A formidable new character, planning a return to Nassau, is introduced. Flint and his crew wage war against anyone who has taken a stance against piracy, and John Silver thinks this is becoming dangerous and reckless. Max has Anne persuade Jack to start repairs on New Providence Island's fort, which is still in ruins after the events of Season 2. Jack has sent Vane to take a ship, claiming there is much-needed timber aboard. However, Vane finds slaves instead and angrily confronts Jack. Jack convinces Vane that slave labour is the only way to fix the fort. Back in England, Eleanor is offered a deal in exchange for her life. Flint and the Walrus come across Hornigold and his crew and are forced to make a difficult decision.
20	2	"XX."	Lukas Ettlin	Jonathan E. Steinberg & Brad Caleb Kane	January 30, 2016	0.759
The crew of the Walrus are forced to brace themselves against the elements. Teach disagrees with Rackham's plans for defending a united Nassau, and Rackham acquiesces to Max's contingency plan to exchange the gold for jewels and gems. Woodes Rogers and Eleanor begin to draft the terms that their partnership will be based upon. Anne begins to worry about the future, what it entails, and where her relationship with Max will go.
21	3	"XXI."	Stefan Schwartz	Jonathan E. Steinberg & Dan Shotz	February 6, 2016	0.501
While stuck at sea, tensions between Flint and Silver begin to rise, and Silver finds himself pushed to his limit by Flint. Max and Anne hear news of Rogers' planned invasion. The port of Nassau prepares to defend itself against the invasion, and Rackham takes the lead of the force. However, Vane makes a difficult decision in order to enlist the help of Teach and ward off Nassau's defeat. Hornigold arrives on the beach offering blanket pardons from Rogers, which quells any initial resistance. He also puts out a bounty on Vane.
22	4	"XXII."	Steve Boyum	Jonathan E. Steinberg & Lisa Schultz Boyd	February 13, 2016	0.640
Flint and his crew are captured by islanders, marched to a hidden village and imprisoned; Flint identifies their captors as escaped slaves. Rogers tells Eleanor he wants her as his counsellor during his move onto Nassau. Jack blows up the fort so that Vane can escape to Teach's ship; on the ship, Teach shows Vane that Eleanor is aboard a Royal Navy vessel, and later wonders where his loyalties lie. Rogers and his men believe they have trapped the remaining pirates until a single ship begins moving across the bay; when it is closer to the Royal Navy, Vane lights the ship on fire and jumps overboard. At the village, Flint tells Silver that the islanders will kill them because they cannot risk their secret being revealed. Under the cover of darkness, Mr. Scott approaches the slaves who escaped from the fort but is challenged by two Royal Navy sailors and injured by the exchange of gunfire. The slaves load him into a boat and make for the open ocean.
23	5	"XXIII."	Alik Sakharov	Jonathan E. Steinberg & Robert Levine	February 20, 2016	0.679
As Flint's crew begins to face certain death in captivity, Flint is spurred into action by Silver to save himself and the crew by appealing to the queen who, it is revealed, is secretly the wife of Mr. Scott. Teach helps Vane with his regrets over Elanor and abandoning Nassau and tries to show him a better path forward without Nassau; Vane comes upon some valuable intelligence from a captured Spanish ship. Max takes issues into her own hands to make her own way forward. However, the surrender of her gems leads to a new threat from Spain for Eleanor and Woodes Rogers, putting their plans on hold. Rackham, unaware of Rogers' knowledge of the gems, leaves the remaining gems with Anne and returns to Nassau to secure a pardon for himself.
24	6	"XXIV."	Lukas Ettlin	Dan Shotz	February 27, 2016	0.603
Flint challenges Teach to a duel. Rogers arrests Rackham and tries to convince him to surrender the gems for the sake of Nassau. Rackham agrees to this but then betrays Rogers. Madi Scotts, the daughter of Maroons Queen and Mr. Scott, helps Silver as he's being held captive.
25	7	"XXV."	Rob Bailey	Marc Berzenski & Josh Rothenberger	March 5, 2016	0.658
Flint and Silver finally make their return to Nassau, and upon their arrival, they find that a legend has been created. Max promises Anne that Rackham will be freed once the gems are returned, but Rackham is jeopardized by an unexpected change of terms. Meanwhile, Vane continues with his mission to retrieve the gems, and it begins to evolve as he discovers the plan to betray Anne. Eleanor begins an intimate relationship with Rogers, confiding in him her desire to truly change.
26	8	"XXVI."	Stefan Schwartz	Evan Bleiweiss	March 12, 2016	0.677
While relocating Rackham, Rogers finds himself under attack. Meanwhile, on the Walrus, violence erupts between the crew members of the ship over the alliance. Silver and Madi find themselves in a situation that put them to the test. Billy finds a new role for himself by remaining on the island.
27	9	"XXVII."	Steve Boyum	Story by : Brad Caleb Kane & Tyler Van Patten; Teleplay by : Brad Caleb Kane	March 19, 2016	0.608
Eleanor visits Vane in prison and redoubles her commitment to his execution. Later, she visits Rogers, who has fallen ill with fever and is bedridden; Rogers grants her emergency power to govern New Providence Island until he recovers. On the Walrus, Flint and Silver attempt a risky manoeuvre to shake Captain Hornigold's pursuit, while on the island, Billy plots a way to buy time before Vane's execution. Rogers becomes unresponsive; Eleanor orders an expedited trial to execute Vane the next day. Flint and Silver discuss leadership styles while Mr Scott passes from his injuries. Billy prepares to rescue Vane, but things don't go according to plan. Flint and Rackham plan how to best defend themselves with the maroons, while Eleanor plans the British offensive with help from local planters. Teach is informed of the outcome of Vane's execution.
28	10	"XXVIII."	Alik Sakharov	Jonathan E. Steinberg & Robert Levine	March 26, 2016	0.644
As Flint buries the treasure, he is questioned by Silver about his true reasons for warring against the British Crown and the tactics for the upcoming battle on the island. On the day of the attack, British troops and Hornigold's men manage to take the beach with superior firepower, forcing Flint and his men to retreat. Meanwhile, Rackham and Anne unite with Blackbeard's fleet, who seeks revenge for the death of Charles Vane. In Nassau, Eleanor is confronted by an anonymous message, which demands the remains of Charles Vane as well as the gibbet be removed from the market square. Rogers recovers and reassures Eleanor of his support in overcoming her enemies. Silver sends Dobbs to the beach to kill Hornigold. In a later battle, Hornigold shoots Dobbs. Hornigold is eventually killed by Flint. In Nassau, a pardoned pirate captain is murdered by Billy, as there was no reaction to the message with the black spot. With the help of Anne and Rackham, Blackbeard's fleet manages to force the Royal Navy to retreat. In Nassau, Billy uses the name "Long John Silver" to create a claim of responsibility for the murder.

=== Season 4 (2017) ===
No. overall	No. in season	Title	Directed by	Written by	Original release date	US viewers (millions)
29	1	"XXIX."	Lukas Ettlin	Jonathan E. Steinberg & Robert Levine	January 29, 2017	0.738
The war for Nassau is well under way, as Flint and Blackbeard's crews set to make landfall. The fort appears lightly armed but landfall still isn't as easy as they anticipated. Falling into a trap, Flint must recover and lead his crew to a successful retreat. Woodes Rogers and Eleanor Guthrie have married, but his divorce from his ex-wife is not without consequence. The pirate and slave forces have been severely decimated as 121 of them are captured and numerous others are dead.
30	2	"XXX."	Alik Sakharov	Jonathan E. Steinberg & Dan Shotz	February 5, 2017	0.340
Long John Silver is captured by a former crewman of Blackbeard and tries to talk his way into freedom. Max finds out about Featherstone and Idelle's involvement in the leaking of secrets to the pirates. Blackbeard begins a blockade of Nassau Harbour that Woodes Rogers devises a plan to counter. The remainder of Flint's crew and Billy's men raid a plantation of New Providence to gather supplies and more men for the war.
31	3	"XXXI."	Roel Reiné	Jonathan E. Steinberg & Brad Caleb Kane	February 12, 2017	0.503
Rogers sets off for Port Royal in order to distract Blackbeard's blockade and allow Eleanor to seek aid from her grandfather in Philadelphia. The alliance between Flint's crew and the maroons is strained after Billy and his men turn their back on them. Flint reunites with Silver and gets reintroduced to Israel Hands. Blackbeard catches up to Rogers' ship and a battle ensues. Flint and his men begin an attack on Nassau.
32	4	"XXXII."	Marc Jobst	Peter Ocko & Michael Russell Gunn	February 19, 2017	0.483
The pirates have taken over Nassau as news of Captain Berringer's death reaches Rogers who is en route back to Nassau. 42 captives from Teach's crew are being transported to Port Royal, but have plans of taking control over the ship. Billy and Silver have words as they discuss the plans for Nassau going forward. Madi tries to talk the former slaves of the Uphill plantation into joining the pirates, but they have reason to worry as a new threat to their success is born.
33	5	"XXXIII."	Alik Sakharov	Jonathan E. Steinberg & Dan Shotz	February 26, 2017	0.448
Eleanor and Flint strike a deal as Governor Rogers attempts to enter Nassau Harbour. Madi and Silver fight about what the deal between Eleanor and Flint means for the future of Nassau. Flint reveals some things about Mr Scott to Eleanor that cause her discomfort. Rogers reverses course and sails towards Havana to seek aid from Spain. Jack arrives in Nassau with the escaped prisoners and tells Flint of his run-in with Rogers.
34	6	"XXXIV."	Steve Boyum	Jonathan E. Steinberg & Robert Levine	March 5, 2017	0.448
A dozen Spanish ships appear over the horizon heading into Nassau Harbour. Silver tries to convince freed slave leader Julius to join forces and fight the Spanish together. Flint, Madi and Eleanor take refuge outside Nassau as the Spanish troops invade. Survivors seek escape via the Walrus and Rogers' captured ship. The pirates plan their next move in the fight for Nassau.
35	7	"XXXV."	Lukas Ettlin	Robert Levine & Brad Caleb Kane	March 12, 2017	0.505
Freed slaves from all over New Providence gather at the hidden village of the Maroons as they plan how to take control of Nassau. Governor Rogers finds out that Eleanor was pregnant before she died. Jack and crew head to Philadelphia to enlist the help of Eleanor's grandfather, who doesn't react to their news as anticipated. Billy tries to get Rogers to split up Flint and Silver as a strategy for him to expel the pirates. Rogers talks to Madi, who is apparently not dead.
36	8	"XXXVI."	Uta Briesewitz	Story by : Jenniffer Castillo & Jillian Molin; Teleplay by : Tyler Van Patten	March 19, 2017	0.473
Jack and Max get ready to depart Philadelphia and return to Nassau. Jack contemplates going through with a costly plan that is the only way he believes Nassau will become economic again. Flint and Silver also return to Nassau to retrieve Madi, but argue about which of their plans is the best. Rogers puts his own plan into action as they come for Madi. Max speaks to Eleanor's grandmother Marion Guthrie about Mrs Guthrie's plan for Nassau.
37	9	"XXXVII."	Steve Boyum	Jonathan E. Steinberg & Dan Shotz	March 26, 2017	0.501
Flint and Silver's crew follow Rogers' ship to Skeleton Island. On Skeleton Island, Flint and Dooley set off to hide the treasure, while Silver sends 6 men after them. A flashback is intermittent where Flint teaches Silver how to sword-fight. Rogers tries to convince Madi to accept his treaty. Jack and his crew also set sail for Skeleton Island. Flint and Silver's ship catches fire.
38	10	"XXXVIII."	Jonathan E. Steinberg	Jonathan E. Steinberg & Robert Levine	April 2, 2017	0.568
Jack and his crew arrive at Skeleton Island and attempt to rescue any survivors in the aftermath of Rogers' ambush of Flint and Silver's crew. Jack, Flint, and Silver sail behind Rogers and the Eurydice to engage them in one final battle. The Eurydice has been seized and Flint and Silver go back to Skeleton Island to retrieve the treasure. Jack returns to Philadelphia to talk to Marion Guthrie about her buying out Rogers' debts. Flint chooses to go to Savannah. Order, at least on the surface, is restored in Nassau.
