= Jonathan E. Steinberg =

American screenwriter

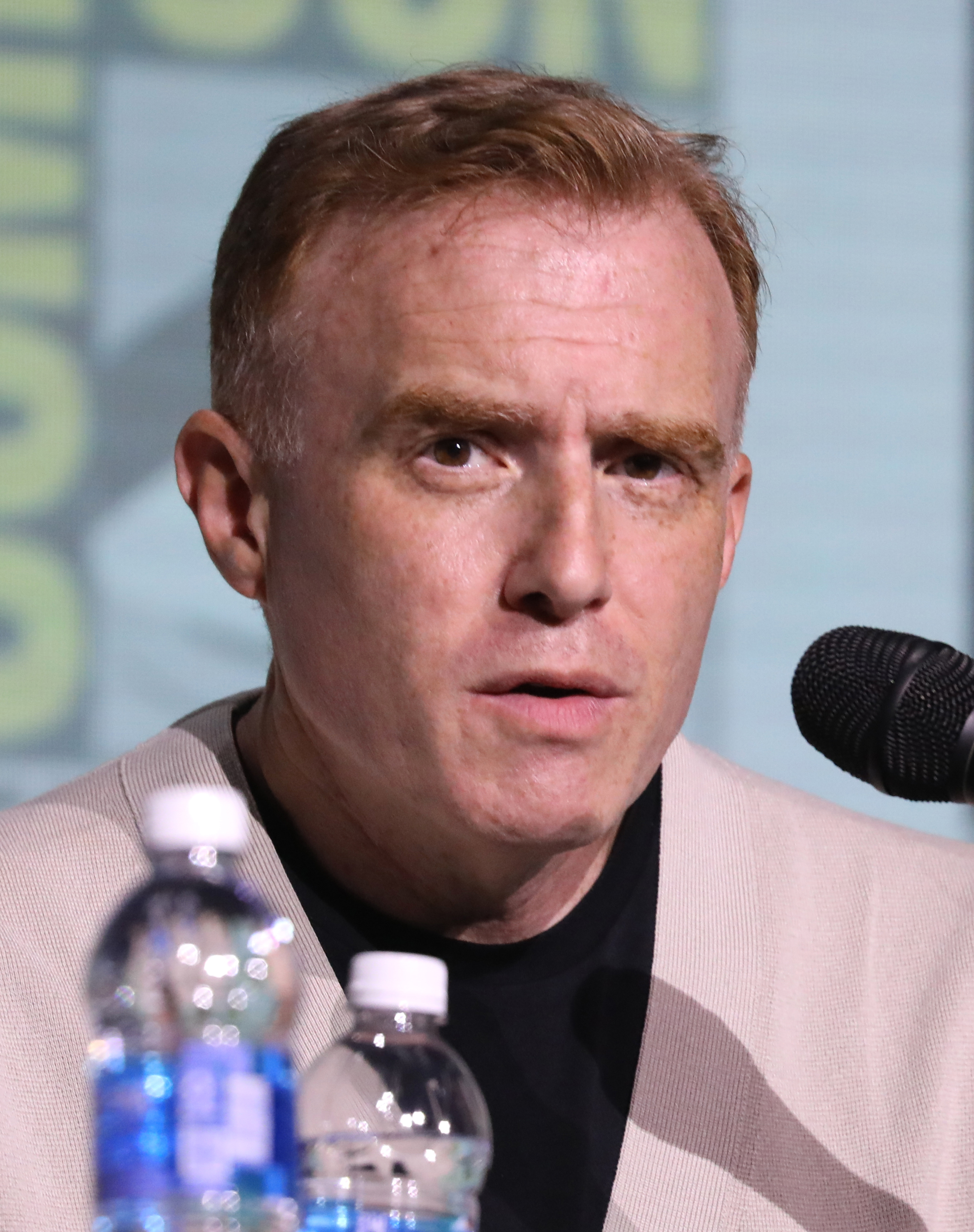
- Occupations: Screenwriter; Television producer Showrunner
- Years active: 2006–present

Jonathan E. Steinberg is an American television producer, screenwriter, and director. Along with Josh Schaer and Stephen Chbosky, he co-created the television series Jericho, where he served as writer, producer and executive story editor, Jericho ran on CBS from September 20, 2006, through March 25, 2008.

In 2010, Steinberg developed the television series Human Target, loosely based on the DC Comics series Human Target, for Fox. He served as writer, executive producer and showrunner for the first season, before producer Matt Miller was brought in as showrunner for the second season. Steinberg remained an executive producer.

January 2014 saw the premiere of the TV series Black Sails on the Starz channel, of which Steinberg is co-creator, executive producer and showrunner.

As of 2021 he was working on The Old Man for FX and Percy Jackson & the Olympians for Disney+.

In March 2025, it was announced that Steinberg, as well as fellow Percy Jackson showrunner Dan Shotz, were in talks to write, produce, and showrun a live-action Power Rangers reboot series for Disney+, a co-production between Hasbro Entertainment and 20th Television. He and Shotz publicly confirmed in December 2025 that they would be developing the series. However, in 2026, it was announced that the series would not be moving forward.

== Personal life ==
Steinberg is also the brother-in-law of Pennsylvania Governor Josh Shapiro. He graduated from Harvard College and the University of Pennsylvania Law School.

== Filmography ==
| Year | Title | Credited as | | | | Notes |
| Year | Title | Writer | Executive producer | Creator | Director | Notes |
|---|---|---|---|---|---|---|
| 2006–2008 | Jericho | Yes | Yes | Yes | No | Co-creator, wrote 6 episodes |
| 2010–2011 | Human Target | Yes | Yes | Yes | No | Developer, wrote 8 episodes |
| 2014–2017 | Black Sails | Yes | Yes | Yes | Yes | Co-creator, wrote 21 episodes Directed: "XXXVIII." |
| 2019 | See | Yes | Yes | No | No | Co-wrote 2 episodes |
| 2022–2024 | The Old Man | Yes | Yes | Yes | No | Co-wrote 7 episodes |
| 2023–present | Percy Jackson and the Olympians | Yes | Yes | Yes | No | Co-creator, Showrunner, co-wrote 6 episodes |
| 2024 | War Game | No | Yes | No | No | |
| TBD | Untitled Power Rangers series | Yes | Yes | Yes | TBD | Co-showrunner with Dan Shotz |
