= Black Sails (TV series) =

American dramatic adventure television series

- Genre: Historical drama; Action-adventure
- Created by: Jonathan E. Steinberg; Robert Levine
- Starring: Toby Stephens; Hannah New; Luke Arnold; Jessica Parker Kennedy; Tom Hopper; Zach McGowan; Toby Schmitz; Clara Paget; Mark Ryan; Hakeem Kae-Kazim; Sean Cameron Michael; Louise Barnes; Rupert Penry-Jones; Luke Roberts; Ray Stevenson; David Wilmot; Harriet Walter
- Composer: Bear McCreary
- Country of origin: United States
- Original language: English
- No. of seasons: 4
- No. of episodes: 38 (list of episodes)

Production
- Executive producers: Michael Bay; Brad Fuller; Andrew Form; Jonathan E. Steinberg; Chris Symes; Robert Levine; Michael Chernuchin; Dan Shotz; Brad Caleb Kane
- Producers: Nina Heyns; Jonathan Brytus; Erik Henry
- Production locations: Cape Town, South Africa
- Cinematography: Lukas Ettlin; Jules O'Loughlin; David Luther; Gavin Struthers
- Editors: Joe Hobeck; Paul Trejo; John Coniglio
- Running time: 49–71 minutes
- Production companies: Platinum Dunes; Quaker Moving Pictures

Original release
- Network: Starz
- Release: January 25, 2014 – April 2, 2017

Black Sails is an American historical action-adventure television series set on New Providence Island. It was written to be a prequel to Robert Louis Stevenson's 1883 novel Treasure Island, while also including depictions of several real-life historical figures and fictionalized versions of actual historical events. The series was created by Jonathan E. Steinberg and Robert Levine for Starz. It debuted online for free on YouTube and other various streaming platform and video-on-demand services on January 18, 2014. The debut on linear pay television followed a week later on January 25, 2014. Steinberg is executive producer, alongside Michael Bay, Brad Fuller and Andrew Form, while Michael Angeli, Doris Egan, and Levine are co-executive producers. The show depicts treasure-seeking pirates in their attempt to establish a Republic of Pirates.

On July 26, 2013, Starz renewed the show for a ten-episode second season, which premiered on January 24, 2015. The early renewal, six months before the first season premiered, was based on the positive fan reaction to the show at San Diego Comic-Con. The series was renewed for a third season on October 12, 2014, and a fourth season on July 31, 2015, both before the respective previous seasons had premiered. On July 20, 2016, Starz announced that the series' fourth season would be its last; the season premiered on January 29, 2017, and the series concluded on April 2, 2017.

== Plot ==
Black Sails is set in the early 18th century, roughly two decades before the events of Treasure Island, during the Golden Age of Piracy. Feared Captain Flint brings on a younger crew member as they fight for the survival of New Providence island. According to the first episode, "In 1715 West Indies, the pirates of New Providence Island threaten maritime trade in the region. The laws of every civilized nation declare them hostis humani generis, enemies of all mankind. In response, the pirates adhere to a doctrine of their own....war against the world." Real life pirates who are fictionalized in the show include Anne Bonny, Benjamin Hornigold, Jack Rackham, Charles Vane, Ned Low, Israel Hands and Blackbeard.

The plot of the first season focuses on the hunt for the Spanish treasure galleon Urca de Lima. At the beginning of the second season, the treasure from the Urca de Lima has been stranded on the shores of Florida with Spanish soldiers guarding it, but by the conclusion of the second season, the treasure has been taken by Jack Rackham and his crew and taken to New Providence Island. During the second season, the questions of how and why Flint—a man who was a Royal Navy officer and London gentleman—turned to piracy are answered. The third and the fourth seasons focus on the war for the control of New Providence between the pirates and Woodes Rogers.

== Cast ==
- Toby Stephens as James McGraw/Flint
- Hannah New as Eleanor Guthrie
- Luke Arnold as "Long" John Silver
- Jessica Parker Kennedy as Max
- Tom Hopper as William "Billy Bones" Manderly
- Zach McGowan as Charles Vane (seasons 1–3)
- Toby Schmitz as Jack Rackham
- Clara Paget as Anne Bonny
- Mark Ryan as Hal Gates (season 1)
- Hakeem Kae-Kazim as Mr. Scott (seasons 1–3)
- Sean Cameron Michael as Richard Guthrie (seasons 1–2)
- Louise Barnes as Miranda Hamilton/Barlow (seasons 1–3)
- Rupert Penry-Jones as Lord Thomas Hamilton (seasons 2, 4)
- Luke Roberts as Woodes Rogers (seasons 3–4)
- Ray Stevenson as Edward Teach (seasons 3–4)
- David Wilmot as Israel Hands (season 4)
- Harriet Walter as Marion Guthrie (season 4)

== Episodes ==
Season	Episodes	Originally released	
Season	Episodes	First released	Last released
1	8	January 25, 2014	March 15, 2014
2	10	January 24, 2015	March 28, 2015
3	10	January 23, 2016	March 26, 2016
4	10	January 29, 2017	April 2, 2017

== Production ==
The series was filmed at Cape Town Film Studios in Cape Town, South Africa, with local production company Film Afrika.

The opening title sequence was made by Imaginary Forces and directors Michelle Dougherty and Karin Fong with the backing sea chantey-inspired theme composed by Battlestar Galactica and The Walking Dead composer Bear McCreary. It accurately features an instrument of the period in the form of the hurdy-gurdy.

For the amount of detail that was added to the vessels, it took over 300 workers to build just one ship.

== Reception ==
The first season of Black Sails received mixed reviews from critics. On Rotten Tomatoes the season holds a rating of 65%, based on 49 reviews, with an average rating of 6.05/10. The site's consensus reads, "Black Sails boasts visual appeal, but the show's bland characters aren't strong enough to keep the show from being dragged down into its murky depths of aimless exposition". On Metacritic season one has a score of 58 of 100, based on 27 critics, indicating "mixed or average reviews".

Tim Goodman of The Hollywood Reporter said, "This ambitious pirate story is helped immensely by going beyond the pay cable freedoms that often bog down lesser shows in boobs, blood and sex. Black Sails steers itself out of that realm after a few episodes and makes a play for bigger, more complicated stories". Robert Lloyd of the Los Angeles Times said, "Black Sails is a pirate treasure. The Starz series vividly depicts the daily life of pirates." Jeff Jensen of Entertainment Weekly said, "Not even a guilty pleasure, Black Sails is arrrrrr-estingly good". Tom Long of the Detroit News commented "Alliances are made and broken, power shifts go this way and that, blood is spilled, and wenches keep wenching. It's oddly addictive, and the cast—made up mostly of British, Australian, and Canadian actors—is as sharp as you'd expect from pay cable".

Conversely, Brian Lowry of Variety said, "Black Sails never quite takes off, developing into a tired treasure hunt with indifferent casting and stock characters. Counting Michael Bay among its producers, this South Africa–lensed production might tempt adventure-seeking viewers to plunge into its crystal-blue waters, but despite some handsome aspects, the show ultimately proves as hollow as its CGI-rendered ships". Emily St. James of The A.V. Club said, "Black Sails is a handsome illusion at times, but it rarely finds its way beyond that."

The second season holds a 100% rating on Rotten Tomatoes, based on 8 reviews, with an average rating of 8.7/10. Neil Genzlinger of The New York Times said, "Starz knows the formula for these costume-heavy action dramas from experience with shows like Spartacus and Camelot. And that formula is executed with particular skill in Black Sails, thanks to some strong performances and an exploration of the consequences of greed that could have come out of modern-day Wall Street".

Season four holds an 80% rating on Rotten Tomatoes based on 10 reviews, with an average rating of 7.8/10. The site's critical consensus reads: "Black Sails marks 'X' and hits the spot during a swashbuckling final season that maintains the series' penchant for rum-soaked spectacle while gracefully delivering these roguish characters to their destinies."

=== Accolades ===
Year	Award	Category	Recipient	Result	Ref.
2014	66th Primetime Creative Arts Emmy Awards	Outstanding Main Title Design	Karen Fong, Michelle Dougherty, Alan Williams, Kris Kuksi, Brian Butcher	Nominated	
2014	66th Primetime Creative Arts Emmy Awards	Outstanding Main Title Theme Music	Bear McCreary	Nominated	
2014	66th Primetime Creative Arts Emmy Awards	Outstanding Sound Editing for a Series	Benjamin L. Cook, Iain Eyre, Susan Cahill, Jeffrey A. Pitts, Tim Tuchrello, Brett Voss, Michael Baber, Jeffrey Wilhoit, James Moriana for "I."	Won	
2014	66th Primetime Creative Arts Emmy Awards	Outstanding Special Visual Effects in a Supporting Role	Erik Henry, Paul Graff, George Murphy, Annemarie Griggs, Mitch Claspy, Jeremy Hattingh, Doug Hardy, Nick Hsieh, Steven Messing for "I."	Won	
2015	67th Primetime Creative Arts Emmy Awards	Outstanding Sound Editing for a Series	Benjamin L. Cook, Stefan Henrix, Susan Cahill, Jeffrey A. Pitts, Brett Voss, Michael Baber, Jeffrey Wilhoit, Dylan Tuomy-Wilhoit for "XVIII."	Nominated	
2015	67th Primetime Creative Arts Emmy Awards	Outstanding Special Visual Effects	Erik Henry, Kevin Rafferty, Paul Stephenson, Annemarie Griggs, Mitch Claspy, Ken Mitchel Jones, Lari Karam, Whitman Lindstrom, Charles Baden for "XVIII."	Nominated	
2015	13th Annual Visual Effects Society Awards	Outstanding Supporting Visual Effects in a Visual Effects-Driven Photoreal/Live Action Broadcast Program	Erik Henry, Annemarie Griggs, Paul Graff, George Murphy for "I."	Nominated	
2016	14th Annual Visual Effects Society Awards	Outstanding Supporting Visual Effects in a Photoreal Episode	Erik Henry, Annemarie Griggs, Kevin Rafferty, Aladino Debert, Paul Stephenson for "XVIII"	Nominated	
2016	14th Annual Visual Effects Society Awards	Outstanding Created Environment in an Episode, Commercial, or Real-Time Project	Aladino Debert, Matt Dougan, Greg Teegarden, Ken Jones for Charles Town Harbor	Nominated	
2016	68th Primetime Creative Arts Emmy Awards	Outstanding Sound Editing for a Series	Benjamin L. Cook, Susan Cahill, Stefan Henrix, Jeffrey A. Pitts, Tim Tuchrello, Brett Voss, Michael Baber, Jeffrey Wilhoit, Dylan Tuomy-Wilhoit for "XX."	Won	
2016	68th Primetime Creative Arts Emmy Awards	Outstanding Special Visual Effects	Erik Henry, Terron Pratt, Ashley J. Ward, Jeremy Hattingh, Paul Stephenson, Aladino Debert, Greg Teegarden, Olaf Wendt, Yafei Wu for "XX."	Nominated	
2017	15th Annual Visual Effects Society Awards	Outstanding Supporting Visual Effects in a Photoreal Episode	Erik Henry, Terron Pratt, Aladino Debert, Yafei Wu, Paul Stephenson for "XX."	Won	
2017	15th Annual Visual Effects Society Awards	Outstanding Created Environment in an Episode, Commercial, or Real-Time Project	Thomas Montminy-Brodeur, Deak Ferrand, Pierre Rousseau, Mathieu Lapierre for "XXVIII." (Maroon Island)	Nominated	
2017	15th Annual Visual Effects Society Awards	Outstanding Compositing in a Photoreal Episode	Michael Melchiorre, Kevin Bouchez, Heather Hoyland, John Brennick for "XX." (Sailing Ships)	Nominated	
2017	69th Primetime Creative Arts Emmy Awards	Outstanding Sound Editing for a Series	Benjamin Cook, Stefan Henrix, Mike Szakmeister, Shaughnessy Hare, Tim Tuchrello, Brett Voss, Michael Baber, Jeffrey Wilhoit, Dylan Tuomy-Wilhoit for "XXXVII."	Nominated	
2017	69th Primetime Creative Arts Emmy Awards	Outstanding Special Visual Effects	Erik Henry, Terron Pratt, Ashley J. Ward, Kevin Rafferty, Paul Dimmer, Yafei Wu, Martin Lipmann, Nicklas Andersson, David Wahlberg for "XXIX."	Nominated	
2018	16th Visual Effects Society Awards	Outstanding Supporting Visual Effects in a Photoreal Episode	Erik Henry, Terron Pratt, Yafei Wu, David Wahlberg, Paul Dimmer for "XXIX"	Won	
