= Lost Girl season 5 =

Lost Girl
- Season 5
- North America DVD cover with Season 5 Part I & Part II billed as Seasons 5 & 6
- No. of episodes: 16

Release
- Original network: Showcase
- Original release: December 7, 2014 – October 25, 2015

Season chronology
- ← Previous; Season 4

Lost Girl is a Canadian supernatural drama television series that premiered on Showcase on September 12, 2010. The series was created by Michelle Lovretta and is produced by Jay Firestone and Prodigy Pictures Inc., with the participation of the Canadian Television Fund (Canada Media Fund), and in association with Shaw Media. It follows the life of a bisexual succubus named Bo, played by Anna Silk, as she learns to control her superhuman abilities, help those in need, and discover the truth about her origins.

On February 27, 2014, Showcase and Shaw Media announced the renewal for a fifth and final season, with production starting in spring and the season set to air Fall 2014. On August 25, 2014, Showcase announced that season 5 would be the last, with the original 13-episode order increased to 16 final episodes and the season divided into Part 1 and Part 2.

In the United States, on March 3, 2015, Syfy announced the premiere of season 5 on April 17, 2015, at 10 p.m., with the show's broadcast day changed to Friday. The time slot was afterwards changed to Thursday at 10 p.m. effective May 21, with episode "Clear Eyes, Fae Hearts".

== Cast and characters ==
=== Main cast ===
- Anna Silk as Bo
- Kris Holden-Ried as Dyson
- Zoie Palmer as Dr. Lauren Lewis
- Rick Howland as Fitzpatrick "Trick" McCorrigan
- Ksenia Solo as Kenzi

=== Recurring cast ===
- Emmanuelle Vaugier as Evony Fleurette Marquise: The Morrigan
- Paul Amos as Vex: a Mesmer
- Rachel Skarsten as Tamsin: a Valkyrie
- Inga Cadranel as Aife: a Succubus and Bo's birth mother
- Vanessa Matsui as Cassie: an Oracle
- Amanda Walsh as Zee: an Ancient (a.k.a. Zeus)
- Luke Bilyk as Mark: a Shapeshifter and son of Dyson
- Noam Jenkins as Heratio: an Ancient (a.k.a. Hera)
- Shanice Banton as Iris: an Ancient (a.k.a. Nyx)
- Lisa Marcos as Alicia Welles: a human
- Eric Roberts as Hades: an Ancient and King of the Underworld, Tartarus, and Bo's father (a.k.a. Jack)
- Hannah Anderson as Persephone: an Ancient, daughter of Zee, wife of Hades, and Bo's stepmother
- Michelle Nolden as Freyja: Mistress of the Valkyries
- Kate Corbett as Stacey: a Valkyrie

== Production ==
On April 9, 2014, Prodigy Pictures and Showcase announced the start of production on 13 episodes, with filming taking place in and around Toronto, and season 5 premiering in Fall 2014.

Michael Grassi, who became a writer and consulting producer for the series in its fourth season, moved into the position of showrunner and executive producer for season 5. Vanessa Piazza, who joined Prodigy Pictures Inc. in 2009 as a producer, was elevated to the position of executive producer on the show.

On August 25, 2014, Showcase and Anna Silk announced that season 5 would be the series' last. The original 13-episode season was extended to 16 episodes and divided into two parts consisting of eight episodes each. The fifth season premiered on December 7, 2014, with its second half scheduled for Fall 2015. On June 1, 2015, Showcase announced the final eight episodes would air beginning September 6.

After Part 1 mid-season finale episode "End of Faes" aired on June 4 in the United States, Syfy announced in a preview of Part 2 that Lost Girl would return in 2016.

== Broadcast ==
Showcase released the first episode of Part 2, "44 Minutes to Save the World", online on August 21, 2015, in advance of the broadcast premiere on September 6, 2015. It was made available for viewing on its website and on multi digital platforms.

== Episodes ==
Note: Showcase released season 5 as one season with 16 episodes broadcast as Part 1 and Part 2, each consisting of 8 episodes. However, some cable distributors of the syndication count each part as a separate season, and beginning with "44 Minutes to Save the World" (ep 5.09) the second half was designated as "season 6".

No. overall	No. in season	Title	Directed by	Written by	Original release date
Part 1
62	1	"Like Hell Pt. 1"	Paolo Barzman	Michael Grassi	December 7, 2014
Bo will go to hell and back to try and save the people she loves – her family.
63	2	"Like Hell Pt. 2"	Paolo Barzman	Emily Andras	December 14, 2014
Bo needs the help of an estranged family member, while Lauren and Kenzi must team up against a mysterious spirit.
64	3	"Big in Japan"	Ron Murphy	Alexandra Zarowny	December 21, 2014
Bo and Tamsin investigate assassination attempts on a Japanese warrior. It turns out the warrior had taken credit for his sister's feats; she was trying to scare him to protect him from turning into an awful creature if he "ascended" to lead their ancestors. Dyson trains Lauren in self defense after she receives numerous death threats in response to her ability to transform fae into humans. Bo temporarily loses her sex drive and ability to feed/heal. She nearly dies after an attack from the shamed warrior. Processing feelings about Kenzi's departure in the hospital/lab, Bo regains her ability to feed.
65	4	"When God Opens a Window"	Mairzee Almas	Steve Cochrane	December 28, 2014
Bo and Tamsin disagree over a young Fae, Mark, who is being stalked by a murderous fae hunter. Mark's mother died when he was young and he still doesn't know what kind of fae he is. Dyson recognizes the hunter as a man who has been hunting shifters like Dyson for a long time. Mark turns out to be a shifter and a son Dyson didn't know he had.
66	5	"It's Your Lucky Fae"	Paolo Barzman	Ley Lukins	January 4, 2015
When an oracle goes missing, Bo goes undercover on a Fae dating website to find the guilty party.
67	6	"Clear Eyes, Fae Hearts"	David Greene	Sandra Chwialkowska	January 11, 2015
Dyson investigates a murder victim who won’t stay dead, while Bo and Tamsin enter the world of college football. Yes, really.
68	7	"Here Comes the Night"	Paolo Barzman	Michael Grassi	January 18, 2015
In the aftermath of a storm, Bo and the gang are met with some surprising revelations and familiar faces.
69	8	"End of Faes"	Ron Murphy	Ley Lukins & Lauren Gosnell	January 25, 2015
Bo and the team attend a party with the mission to take down a new enemy. Plus: Bo's father revealed!
Part 2
70	9	"44 Minutes to Save the World"	Gail Harvey	Sandra Chwialkowska	August 21, 2015 (online); September 6, 2015 (TV)
Bo and her allies race to stop an ancient evil from wreaking mass destruction.
71	10	"Like Father, Like Daughter"	Paolo Barzman	Alexandra Zarowny	September 13, 2015
Bo risks her life to retrieve an elusive Fae painting for a friend, while Lauren makes a stunning revelation.
72	11	"Sweet Valkyrie High"	Bruce McDonald	Emily Andras	September 20, 2015
A dangerous mission forces Tamsin to confront her past mistakes, while Lauren breaks bad news to a friend.
73	12	"Judgement Fae"	Lee Rose	Lara Azzopardi & Lauren Gosnell	September 27, 2015
Bo tracks down an old foe who has taken on a new form.
74	13	"Family Portrait"	Ron Murphy	Michael Grassi	October 4, 2015
Bo searches for truth when conflicting versions of her past emerge.
75	14	"Follow the Yellow Trick Road"	Paolo Barzman	Ley Lukins	October 11, 2015
Under lockdown, the gang rallies to save one of their own.
76	15	"Let Them Burn"	Mairzee Almas	Sandra Chwialkowska	October 18, 2015
A shocking discovery forces Bo to make a difficult decision.
77	16	"Rise"	Paolo Barzman	Michael Grassi	October 25, 2015
In the series finale, Bo and her allies face off against the ultimate threat.
