= Lost Girl season 2 =

Season of television series

Lost Girl
- Season 2
- North America DVD cover
- No. of episodes: 22

Release
- Original network: Showcase
- Original release: September 4, 2011 – April 1, 2012

Season chronology
- ← Previous; Season 1 Next → Season 3

Lost Girl is a Canadian supernatural drama television series that premiered on Showcase on September 12, 2010. The series was created by Michelle Lovretta and is produced by Jay Firestone and Prodigy Pictures Inc., with the participation of the Canadian Television Fund (Canada Media Fund), and in association with Shaw Media. It follows the life of a bisexual succubus named Bo, played by Anna Silk, as she learns to control her superhuman abilities, help those in need, and discover the truth about her origins.

On November 12, 2010, Showcase renewed Lost Girl for a second season, announcing "record-breaking ratings" and the "number one scripted series for Adults 25-54 across all specialty channels" in Canada. On July 7, 2011, Showcase announced that the Season Two premiere would be on September 4, 2011, and that an additional nine episodes had been ordered to make the season a total of 22 episodes.

In the United Kingdom and Ireland, Season Two premiered on Syfy (UK) on January 12, 2012. In Australia, Season Two premiered on Sci Fi on February 23, 2012. In the United States, Season Two premiered on Syfy on April 16, 2012; one week after the end of Season One.

== Plot ==
I can be more powerful than all other Fae. Everyone will kneel at my feet. There will be no more Dark and no more Light. There will be only me.

— Bo, Death Didn't Become Him (2.08)

Bo faces personal challenges with Dyson after she found out in Blood Lines that he had lied to her about knowing who her birth mother was and that he had been Trick's undercover agent, then later about his lost feelings of passion for her; and with Lauren when their relationship becomes complicated after The Morrigan informed Bo in "It's Better to Burn Out Than Fae Away" that Lauren had a girlfriend. At the same time that she is coping with these turmoils, a villainous and evil ancient enemy of the Fae, the Garuda, is awakened and reappears with the intent to destroy the truce between Light and Dark Fae, and reignite the Great War between them. The new Ash, Lachlan, recruits Bo to be his champion in the battle against the Garuda and she agrees on the condition that he regard her as a partner, not as his servant. Bo learns in Into the Dark that she is not only Trick's maternal granddaughter, but deduces that she has inherited some of his Blood Sage powers: if her blood comes into contact with someone's open wound, it can enslave and bind the recipient to her will (the same power that her mother, Aife, used to create male slaves). She uses her blood power to unite her team in the final battle against the Garuda.

== Cast and characters ==
=== Main cast ===
- Anna Silk as Bo
- Kris Holden-Ried as Dyson
- Ksenia Solo as Kenzi
- Zoie Palmer as Dr. Lauren Lewis
- Rick Howland as Fitzpatrick "Trick" McCorrigan
- K. C. Collins as Hale Santiago

=== Recurring cast ===
- Emmanuelle Vaugier as Evony Fleurette Marquise: The Morrigan.
- Paul Amos as Vex: a Mesmer.
- Kate Trotter as The Norn.
- Vincent Walsh as Lachlan: The Ash, a Naga
- Lina Roessler as Ciara: a Fairy-Scuffock hybrid.
- Anthony Lemke as Ryan Lambert: a Dark Fae.
- Hayley Nault as the Nain Rouge: a divine Fae spirit.
- Raoul Trujillo as The Garuda: an ancient and fiendish powerful enemy of the Fae.
- Athena Karkanis as Nadia: Lauren's human girlfriend.
- Aaron Ashmore as Nate: Kenzi's boyfriend.

== Production ==
Showcase renewed Lost Girl for a second season on November 12, 2010, announcing "record-breaking ratings" and the "number one scripted series for Adults 25-54 across all specialty channels" in Canada.

Production on thirteen episodes for Season Two began on May 17, 2011, with filming taking place at a Toronto soundstage and at locations in and around the city until September 22, for a targeted Fall 2011 premiere.

On May 18, 2011, Syfy (U.S.) announced that it had acquired 26 episodes (Season One and Season Two) of Lost Girl from Prodigy Pictures.

Showcase announced in a July 7, 2011, press release that the Season Two premiere would be on September 4, 2011, and that an additional nine episodes had been ordered to make the season a total of 22 episodes. The order for more episodes was made public two weeks before the first appearance of Lost Girl cast and producers at San Diego Comic-Con in 2011.

On December 12, 2011, Syfy announced the United States debut of Lost Girl on January 16, 2012. Season Two premiered on April 16, 2012 (one week after the finale episode of Season One).

== Broadcast special ==
The finale of Season Two on April 1, 2012, was preceded by the Showcase special, Lost Girl Finale Pre-Show. Filmed on the series' "Dal Riata" set, the live audience one-hour program hosted by Lost Girl writer Steve Cochrane featured behind-the-scenes footage and interviews with Anna Silk, Kris Holden-Ried, Ksenia Solo, Zoie Palmer, Rick Howland, K.C. Collins, Paul Amos, and executive producer Jay Firestone.

== Episodes ==
No. overall	No. in season	Title	Directed by	Written by	Original release date	CAN viewers (millions) (Note: Canada ratings results)
14	1	"Something Wicked This Fae Comes"	Robert Lieberman	Michelle Lovretta	September 4, 2011	0.420
It is three weeks after Aife's attack. The Ash is close to death and Trick, with the help of Bo, Kenzi and Hale, is trying to keep things under control as the Dark Fae try to take advantage of the situation. Dyson returns after being missing since seeing the Norn, but his relationship with Bo suffers. A cursed group of Fae disguised as a travelling circus arrive and break the connection between The Ash and the land in order to claim it for themselves. A strange young Fae warns Bo that something old and evil is coming for her, but gives no specific information.
15	2	"I Fought the Fae (and the Fae Won)"	Steve DiMarco	Michelle Lovretta	September 11, 2011	0.358
A representative of the Fae council, the Blackthorn, declares that a new Ash must be elected. This involves candidates competing in a vote by the old families and then a Stag Hunt of a Light Fae prisoner named Sabine. Bo becomes involved when Sabine goes to her for help in finding her love and seeing him is her last wish. Bo then turns to the politics and rituals of the Stag Hunt. She discovers one of the candidates, Lachlan, is immune to her powers. Sabine is shot by Lachlan and he is crowned the new Ash. Bo attempts to mend her relationship with Dyson, but fails. Trick is confronted by the Blackthorn who seems to know that Trick is the Blood King.
16	3	"Scream a Little Dream"	George Mihalka	Jeremy Boxen	September 18, 2011	0.332
Bo is contacted by a Fae who works as a doorman in an apartment building, whose tenants are losing their minds. Kenzi hires a Brownie to clean Bo's home, but she takes him for granted against Trick's warnings. The new Ash comes between Lauren and Bo, forbidding them from seeing each other. Bo has nightmares that sap her strength, eventually discovering that her dreams and that of the humans are being fed on by a Mare. Bo discovers that the doorman is a Dark Fae called a Sandman, taking advantage of the chaos among the Light Fae and getting Bo involved in order to have the Mare feed on her. Bo refuses Lachlan's offer to work for him.
17	4	"Mirror, Mirror"	Steve DiMarco	Emily Andras	September 25, 2011	N/A
After a night of drinking an intoxicated Kenzi accidentally invokes the witch Baba Yaga to put a curse on Dyson and Bo. Kenzi tries to lift the curse by seeking out her aunt, a fortune teller, for help. Bo agrees to work for the Ash in return for getting help to save Kenzi. Bo enlists the help of a Water nymph and nearly drowns, but is revived by Dyson. Kenzi manages to defeat Baba Yaga by shoving her into her own oven, and breaks Baba Yaga's mirror into pieces, giving them to Baba Yaga's captives, allowing them all to escape. Kenzi promises to be more careful going forward and encourages Bo to keep fighting for Dyson and Lauren and for what makes her happy.
18	5	"BrotherFae of the Wolves"	Clark Johnson	Alexandra Zarowny	October 2, 2011	0.345
An old pack mate of Dyson, Cayden, arrives and asks for help in tracking down a stolen Mongolian death worm. Dyson, with Bo's help, discovers that it will be sold in an auction. Cayden's arrival triggers memories of Dyson's past including a long dead friend and his dead friend's mate, Ciara, and the events that lead to Dyson's leaving his pack. Bo wins the auction, but discovers the person running the auction was Cayden's former partner who had double-crossed him by stealing the Mongolian death worm and attempting to sell it on his own. Dyson and Cayden battle, but Cayden escapes and the worm is recovered along with Ciara, who was thought dead. Lauren escapes the Ash and takes sanctuary in Bo's home.
19	6	"It's Better to Burn Out Than Fae Away"	Gail Harvey	Steve Cochran	October 30, 2011	0.265
The Morrigan hires Bo to find an artist that has been painting murals of herself, Vex, and a vampire that Vex killed earlier in Season 1. Bo becomes involved in a power struggle between Vex and the Morrigan; she discovers that one of the Morrigan's assistants was attempting to kill them both. The Ash arrives at Bo's home and commands Lauren to return to him. When Bo returns, she and Lauren become intimate. The Morrigan gives Bo a means to free Lauren, but in doing so, Bo discovers that Lauren has a girlfriend. At the end of the episode, Lauren is seen talking to her girlfriend, who is encased in a pod-like capsule.
20	7	"Fae Gone Wild"	Lynne Stopkewich	Alexandra Zarowny	November 6, 2011	0.236
A group of strippers break out a cop killer from the police station. Bo investigates when a Fae identifies one of them as her daughter. Bo and Kenzi investigate a strip club and discover that all of the dancers there are Selkie, and are attempting to steal their pelts back from the owner of the club. Trick discovers that there is something happening with the Light and Dark Fae that is resulting in many deaths, but does not know why. Bo learns that Lauren's girlfriend Nadia has been in a coma for the past five years. Bo and Lauren discover what the Morrigan gave to Bo as the solution to save Nadia, but have no idea what it is.
21	8	"Death Didn't Become Him"	Steve DiMarco	Steve Cochrane	November 13, 2011	N/A
A friend of Trick's asks for his help when his deceased husband's body is stolen. Bo and Dyson investigate and discover that a Lich has taken the body and reanimated it. Bo and Lauren confront him, but he threatens to kill her unless she drains Lauren. Bo is shot by the Lich, who then prepares to eat Lauren. Bo comes back to life and takes the Chi from everyone save for Lauren. Bo speaks in a strange voice and declares that she can make everyone obey her, but then collapses and returns to normal. Before the Lich dies, he reveals Nadia has been cursed. Meanwhile, Hale and Kenzi deal with a teenage Fae who has been placed in Hale's care after her night on the town.
22	9	"Original Skin"	Paul Fox	Emily Andras	November 20, 2011	0.285
Bo, Dyson, Kenzi, Hale, Trick, Ciara, and Lauren are drawn to the Dal. A Dark Fae hunter, who is tracking an escaped prisoner, traps all of them there. The prisoner contaminates the beer so he can move between bodies. The Nain Rouge appears to Bo when she is stuck in Limbo as a result. Bo is told that the Fae will come to an end and her destiny is to kill Trick. Bo returns from Limbo, and all of the people in the Dal switch bodies. The prisoner escapes in Lauren's body and attempts to kill the Ash. Dyson, in Kenzi's body, manages to stop him. Trick finds a way to return everyone back to their own bodies. Bo tells Trick that the Nain Rouge told her something terrible was coming and that she was called Isabeau in her vision.
23	10	"Raging Fae"	David Greene	Jeremy Boxen	November 27, 2011	0.223
Bo discovers an illegal fighting ring in which Fae battle Fae and one human that appears to be superpowered. Mel, the sister of the first person Bo killed, arrives in town seeking revenge. Bo's guilt eats away at her, affecting her investigation. Dyson takes the evidence of the underground fighting ring to the Ash, who refuses to do anything about it. It is revealed that the superpowered human's son is Fae and was accidentally drugging him. Bo talks to Mel to clear her conscience, but is forgiven via a cover story that Hale has told Mel. Bo reveals to Trick the vision from the Nain Rouge of her killing him.
24	11	"Can't See the Fae-Rest"	Gail Harvey	Shelley Scarrow	December 4, 2011	0.377
Dyson and Hale investigate a slew of human deaths, concluding that Fae must be involved. Bo and Kenzi go undercover with Ciara's help. A Fae called a Batibat, named Maganda, is discovered to be killing the men to collect items they own that were made from a tree that she was linked to. She is captured and the Fae trader that has been selling the items to the humans in the city is forced to return all of the items. Lauren is ordered by the Ash to discover why Light Fae are being killed. In return she asks for the Ash's help with Nadia, but he refuses her. When Lauren defies him, he imprisons her.
25	12	"Masks"	Lee Rose	Grant Rosenberg	December 11, 2011	N/A
Lauren learns that the old Ash cursed Nadia in order to have Lauren find a cure that he needed. The new Ash reveals which Shaman set the curse and Ash sends Bo to lift the curse, but states that Lauren can never know, as the act must be selfless in order to work. With Dyson's help, she recovers a healing mask from a Preta. Bo then uses the mask to save the Shaman's life, and then lifts the curse on Nadia. She also destroys the means for the Shaman to curse others. Meanwhile, Kenzi plans a surprise party and falls for an old childhood friend, Nate. At the party, Bo receives a bracelet from an unknown man. Believing the Ash cured Nadia, Lauren gratefully pledges her servitude to him once more.
26	13	"Barometz. Trick. Pressure."	Paolo Barzman	Steve Cochrane	December 18, 2011	0.308
Lauren and Nadia leave town to spend some time alone, with the Ash's permission. Having grown close, Nate asks Kenzi to leave town with him; Kenzi agrees. Trick intends to use the coming of the Blood Moon to see into the future. He sees his wife, who tells him that he made a mistake in ending the Great Fae War. Trick sees through the lie and faces the Evil One foretold by the Nain Rouge, the Garuda. Trick is attacked in the vision and is badly injured, along with Dyson and Hale. Bo confronts the Ash and discovers that the Ash has been testing her. The Ash then reveals to Bo that he is a Nāga and tells Bo about the Garuda. He asks Bo to be his "champion".
27	14	"Midnight Lamp"	David Winning	Jeremy Boxen	January 22, 2012	0.330
Kenzi has left town with Nate and the Ash asks Bo to locate a Djinn named Sadie (Lauren Holly) for him. Trick, Hale and Dyson have recovered from what happened in the previous episode, and Trick shares what he has learned. Dyson seeks out help from the Norn to help him love Ciara, but she refuses. Bo meets the unknown man from her party, Ryan, who is a Loki. With the help of Ryan, Dyson, and Hale, Bo manages to trick and capture Sadie. Bo sees The Ash and tells him she will not be his champion, but will work with him as a partner. Bo returns to Ryan and sleeps with him, after which he reveals that he is a Dark Fae.
28	15	"Table for Fae"	David Greene	Duana Taha	January 29, 2012	0.264
Ryan attempts to help Nate by striking a deal with the Morrigan, but it goes awry and Kenzi is forced to make a deal with the Morrigan to save Nate's life. Hale investigates a case in which backpackers are turning up years older and dying soon after. Trick suggests it is a Serket, and Bo discovers that there a medical clinic in the area where Dark Fae take youth from humans and give it to those that pay for it. Bo convinces the younger sister to rebel against the older and the scheme is ended. After hearing about Ryan's deal with the Morrigan, Bo intends to end things with him, but is persuaded not to.
29	16	"School's Out"	James Dunnison	Jay Firestone & Harris Goldberg	February 12, 2012	N/A
Bo continues to hide her relationship with Ryan, but feels conflicted over it. Dyson investigates a high school when a student collapses after speaking nonsense while reading an assignment. Dyson, Bo, and Kenzi go undercover as a counselor, teacher, and student, and discover that a Fae called an Akvan has kissed classmates and made them sick. The disease comes from the eggs of a Simurgh, which he unknowingly ingested. Lauren returns from her trip with Nadia but Nadia suspects that Lauren is keeping secrets from her. Bo again attempts to end things with Ryan but is convinced not to.
30	17	"The Girl Who Fae'd With Fire"	Brett Sullivan	Emily Andras	February 19, 2012	0.232
Hale asks Kenzi to be his pretend girlfriend at an upcoming event for the Noble Fae families. Kenzi agrees, but Nate becomes concerned that something is going on. Nadia confronts Bo about Lauren; Bo tells Nadia she has nothing to worry about. Hale's family rejects Kenzi and expresses disdain for anyone outside their family, especially humans. Bo discovers that the Fae families are being attacked by a Cherufe that the Noble Fae families have double-crossed. Bo stops the attack, and announces the coming of the Garuda to the families, but none of them are willing to help her. Meanwhile, Nadia's behavior grows increasingly violent and bizarre, worrying Lauren.
31	18	"Fae-nted Love"	Michael DeCarlo	Shelley Scarrow	March 4, 2012	N/A
An injured Bo feeds off of Ryan and accidentally turns him into her thrall by mixing their blood. Kenzi's friend Tryst returns and asks for help to find out why his grandmother has given everything she owns to a church. Bo and Kenzi investigate and discover the leader of the church is a Fae called an Addonc, who causes Bo to lose her memory. Bo, now not knowing she is a succubus, or who she is, meets Ryan and agrees to marry him. Kenzi and Trick find a cure and Bo regains her memories; Ryan and Bo finally end their relationship. Dyson leaves town after an interrogating a murder suspect. Bo confronts Trick about what he knows, wanting answers about her past.
32	19	"Truth and Consequences"	Lee Rose	Grant Rosenberg	March 11, 2012	N/A
The Ash tells Bo that one of the most powerful Fae, the Glaive, might be making an alliance with The Garuda and asks Bo to remove that threat. Hale brings Trick and The Ash together and they begin to share information. Kenzi meets with Trick and is told that Bo's love for Kenzi is a weakness. Kenzi tells Nate that they cannot be together any longer; she explains that her place is with Bo. Lauren tries to figure out what is wrong with Nadia, who attacks both her and Kenzi. Bo arrives and confronts Nadia, discovering that Nadia is possessed by The Garuda. When Nadia attacks Lauren, Bo is forced to kill Nadia.
33	20	"Lachlan's Gambit"	Steve DiMarco	Steve Cochrane	March 18, 2012	0.264
A gang of Berserkers, sent by The Garuda, attack Trick, but are repelled by Bo, Hale and Ciara. Dyson visits the Wolf Spirit and believes that by defeating the Garuda, his love will be restored. The Ash attempts to get Trick to write a new future with his blood, but is stopped by Dyson and Bo. The evening before the battle with the Garuda, Bo and Lauren spend the night together, as do Dyson and Ciara. The group faces off against the Garuda but lose badly, with Ciara being killed in battle. Distraught, Bo finally accepts her role as the Ash's champion.
34	21	"Into the Dark"	John Fawcett	Emily Andras	March 25, 2012	0.241
A wake is held for Ciara at the Dal Riata, Bo and her friends trying to cope. Bo confronts Trick who explains that he is Bo's grandfather, but does not know who Bo's father is. He also explains that Bo's blood has the power to enslave others; using that power may turn her to the dark side. The Nain Rouge appears and states that to defeat the Garuda, the Light and Dark Fae must be joined. Bo asks The Morrigan for Vex's help, but is refused. Kenzi physically threatens the Norn and is able to restore Dyson's love. After saving Vex from a gang called the Red Caps, Vex agrees to help Bo.
35	22	"Flesh and Blood"	Steve DiMarco	Alan McCullough	April 1, 2012	0.323
Trick gives Bo a vial of life essence to use in the event she feels herself slipping towards the dark side. He is kidnapped by the Garuda; it is revealed that Trick's wife tried to broker a peace during the Great Fae War, but was murdered. To save his own life, Trick wrote the Fae Laws. Lauren gives Bo the venom she has saved and Bo reveals her plan to enslave her friends with her blood in order to overpower the Garuda. The Garuda enters Trick's body; Bo uses the venom to kill the Garuda and Trick. Bo begins to slip into darkness, but uses the vial of life essence to revive Trick. Kenzi unbinds everyone from Bo to stop her from growing too strong. Despite the chance to be free from the Ash, Lauren decides to stay with Bo. Bo remains uncertain about the effects of the dark that is growing within her.

== Reception and popularity ==
In Season Two, the decision to cut eight seconds of an emotive scene between Bo and Lauren from "Scream a Little Dream" created controversy among LGBT fans of the show, resulting in the network being accused of insensitivity and censorship. Lost Girl producers responded to the backlash by issuing a public statement on the show's Facebook page explaining that the edits were done in-house, and not by Syfy, for "timing and not content." As noted by Dorothy Snarker writing for AfterEllen: "With so little representation of gay relationships on TV, every little touch matters." After this experience, beginning with Season Three, the traditional opening credits accompanied by the Lost Girl Theme song were replaced with all opening credits superimposed over footage of the first scene, sparing 00:30 seconds from being edited out of the episodes for Syfy (U.S.).

In a 2012 report by TiVo of television programs watched at bedtime, Lost Girl was rated one of the top ten, most watched shows.

In a Slate magazine 2012 year-end list of 15 favorite television shows that are a pleasure to watch, Lost Girl (on Syfy) was named "Number 1" on the list, and hailed as "Sexy, snarky, and Canadian."

== Home media release ==
On November 13, 2012, Berkshire Axis Media released Season Two in Canada on DVD and Blu-ray. In the United States (Region 1), Giant Ape Media (Funimation SC) released the Season 2 uncut episodes "not seen on Syfy" on DVD and Blu-ray on November 13, 2012. In the United Kingdom and Ireland (Region 2), Sony Pictures Home Entertainment released the DVD of Season 2 on September 9, 2013. In Australia, Universal Sony Pictures released Season Two on September 19, 2013.

== Awards and nominations ==
=== Canadian Screen Awards ===
Year	Category	Nominee	Result	Ref
2013	Best Production Design or Art Direction in a Fiction Program or Series	Ian Brock (for "Something Wicked This Fae Comes")	Nominated	
2013	Best Writing in a Dramatic Series	Emily Andras (for "Into the Dark")	Nominated	
2013	Best Achievement in Casting	Lisa Parasyn (for "Barometz. Trick. Pressure.")	Nominated	
2013	Best Performance by an Actress in a Featured Supporting Role in a Dramatic Program or Series	Ksenia Solo (for "The Girl Who Fae'd With Fire/Truth and Consequences")	Nominated	

=== Leo Awards ===
Year	Category	Nominee	Result	Ref
2013	Best Direction in a Dramatic Series	David Winning (for "Midnight Lamp")	Nominated	

=== WorldFest-Houston International Film Festival ===
Year	Category	Nominee	Result	Ref
2012	Television and Cable Production – Directing – Television	David Winning	Won	
