= Lost Girl season 4 =

Lost Girl
- Season 4
- North America DVD cover
- No. of episodes: 13

Release
- Original network: Showcase
- Original release: November 10, 2013 – February 16, 2014

Season chronology
- ← Previous; Season 3 Next → Season 5

Lost Girl is a Canadian supernatural drama television series that premiered on Showcase on September 12, 2010. The series was created by Michelle Lovretta and is produced by Jay Firestone and Prodigy Pictures Inc., with the participation of the Canadian Television Fund (Canada Media Fund), and in association with Shaw Media. It follows the life of a bisexual succubus named Bo, played by Anna Silk, as she learns to control her superhuman abilities, help those in need, and discover the truth about her origins.

On February 28, 2013, Showcase renewed Lost Girl for a fourth season consisting of thirteen episodes, with production starting in the spring. Season Four premiered November 10, 2013, with its Sunday night broadcast changed from a 9 p.m. to 10 p.m. time slot.

In the United States, Syfy announced on the same date the renewal for a fourth season to begin in 2014. On November 22, 2013, Syfy announced the January 13, 2014, premiere of Season Four, with the show's Monday broadcast schedule changed from 10 p.m. to 8 p.m. On January 23, 2014, Syfy announced that the series' broadcast was returning to 10 p.m. (effective Episode 4.03 on January 27, 2014). The January 16, 2014, premiere of Season Four in the United Kingdom and Ireland on Syfy (UK) was announced on December 17, 2013. On February 5, 2014, Syfy (UK) announced that the time slot for the show had been changed from 10 p.m. to 9 p.m., effective immediately.

== Plot ==
While Kenzi, Hale, and Dyson, are all living their lives, Bo is nowhere to be found. It's later realized that they simply forgot Bo, as someone was forcing them to. Massimo has been giving Kenzi temporary powers to appear Fae. Bo finally awakens to find herself on a train, and later jumps off. A group of Fae called the "Una Mens" are introduced. When she arrives home, it is discovered that while Bo herself did not consciously choose a side, her blood has chosen Dark. Tamsin is found reborn, as a little girl, and grows up with Kenzi as her pseudo-mom. Massimo steals from Bo and Kenzi in an attempt to convince Kenzi to pay him, and Bo figures out that he is not Fae, but human. He also kidnaps Tamsin to acquire her Valkyrie hair, and after being defeated by Bo, chases after the hair into a pit of lava, where at that point he is presumed to be dead. Many of Trick's secrets and past actions are revealed, including a tie to a past life of Tamsin's, and the fact that he used his blood to "erase" someone from existence. Tamsin discovers that by not taking the soul of a man named Rainer to Valhalla, she is part of the reason "The Wanderer" was created. Bo is able to get back on the train, where she finally meets Rainer, and brings him back to the Dal. Hale and Kenzi admit their feelings for each other. Lauren, who has been working with the Dark, somehow turns the Morrigan human. Kenzi's mother is introduced, and Hale attempts to propose. Massimo returns, and protecting Kenzi, Hale is killed. Kenzi tries to get revenge, but is stopped by Vex, who mentions that he is Massimo's guardian. Evony is revealed to be Massimo's mother, and gave him to Vex years ago when he was a boy. Bo learns that not only is her father coming, but that to close the portal, she will need to give her heart. That is revealed to be Kenzi, who sacrifices herself. It ends with Bo visiting Kenzi's grave.

== Cast and characters ==
=== Main cast ===
- Anna Silk as Bo
- Kris Holden-Ried as Dyson
- Ksenia Solo as Kenzi
- Zoie Palmer as Dr. Lauren Lewis
- Rick Howland as Fitzpatrick "Trick" McCorrigan
- K. C. Collins as Hale Santiago

=== Recurring cast ===
- Emmanuelle Vaugier as Evony Fleurette Marquise: The Morrigan
- Paul Amos as Vex: a Mesmer
- Rachel Skarsten as Tamsin: a Valkyrie
- Tim Rozon as Massimo: The Druid.
- Christine Horne as The Keeper: the inquisitor of The Una Mens.
- Kyle Schmid as Rainer: a rebel Fae.
- Ali Liebert as Crystal: a waitress at the diner Lauren worked in while in hiding.
- Mia Kirshner as Clio: an Elemental Nymph.
- Rob Archer as Bruce: a bodyguard and hatchet man for The Morrigan (species unknown).
- Inga Cadranel as Aife: a Succubus and Bo's birth mother.

== Production ==
Midway through Season Three, Showcase announced the renewal of Lost Girl for a fourth season on February 28, 2013, citing consistent delivery of "stellar ratings" and a "cornerstone series" for the network. Later on the same day, Syfy announced it had renewed Lost Girl for a fourth season containing thirteen episodes, and premiering in 2014.

On May 31, 2013, Prodigy Pictures and Showcase announced that filming had begun on thirteen episodes for Season Four, with an expected premiere in Fall 2013; followed with a start of production announcement by Syfy on June 4, 2013.

Showcase announced its 2013 Fall schedule on July 11, 2013, with Season Four premiering on November 10, 2013, and its Sunday night broadcast changing from a 9 p.m. to 10 p.m. time slot.

As a lead-in to the premiere of Season Four, Showcase announced the streaming of a four-part original web series on the Lost Girl website, with the first episode released on October 13, 2013.

On November 22, 2013, Syfy announced the January 13, 2014, premiere of Season Four, with the show's Monday broadcast schedule changed from 10 p.m. to 8 p.m.

On January 23, 2014, Syfy announced that the series' broadcast was returning to 10 p.m. (effective Episode 4.03 on January 27, 2014).

== Broadcast special ==
The premiere of Season Four was preceded by Lost Girl: An Evening at the Clubhouse, a one-hour special featuring cast-on-cast interviews, webisode footage and a sneak peek. During the pre-show, cast reflected on both the past and upcoming seasons, revealed behind-the-scenes stories, and responded to fan questions.

== Episodes ==
No. overall	No. in season	Title	Directed by	Written by	Original release date
49	1	"In Memoriam"	Paolo Barzman	Emily Andras	November 10, 2013
A case of stolen memory hits close to home in the Season 4 opener. At the same time, the new Morrigan intends on putting some past events permanently out of mind. Kenzi and Dyson are at the clubhouse and the two of them flirt and then kiss. When Kenzi and Dyson take on Aife (who they do not remember)'s case of her stolen memory, they soon learn that they too have had their memories stolen. They attend a dark fae ball to gain a compass that will regain their memories, and Kenzi dances a tango with both Hale and Dyson in order to attract a powerful fae's attention. She gains the compass and the gang's memories are restored, leaving them with full knowledge of Bo and her disappearance. Meanwhile, Bo wakes up on a strange train, unaware of where she is.
50	2	"Sleeping Beauty School"	Steve DiMarco	Alexandra Zarowny	November 17, 2013
After remembering Bo, Dyson revisits the crash site and finds a small girl who is Tamsin reincarnated. She has no memories of what happened, but Dyson and Trick leave her under Kenzi's watch in case she remembers something useful. Meanwhile, Dyson and Hale track down an elemental fae who may be able to find Bo. Tamsin however, finds the tarot card in a box of Trick's things that turns out to be a train ticket to the train Bo is on. Dyson takes the ticket and attempts to board the train, which is a death train, with the help of Clio, an elemental who keeps popping up at exactly the right moment. During this, Hale confesses his feelings to Kenzi, who admits she feels the same way and the two passionately kiss. The scene ends with Bo finally escaping the train, unaware that Dyson is trying to find her.
51	3	"Lovers. Apart."	Andy Mikita	Steve Cochrane	November 24, 2013
After jumping off the train Bo finds herself back on earth where she discovers a house in the woods. At first, it seems like the father is abusive and Bo tries to help the daughter escape, but it becomes quickly apparent that the family is being haunted by a "body jumper" fae. Bo is too late to figure it out and the daughter is possessed. Soon, Dyson and Clio (Mia Kirshner) the elemental come to help and in a combined effort they bring peace to the unrestful soul. In exchange for Bo’s help, the body jumper tells her of Clio's treachery and she and Dyson are ready when her betrayal surfaces. At the same time, as things start heating up between Lauren and her fellow waitress, she discovers that she is no longer safe and needs to leave town right away. Everything seems to go smoothly until the waitress betrays Lauren by bringing her attacker to her.
52	4	"Turn to Stone"	Paolo Barzman	Michael Grassi	December 1, 2013
Bo has returned home and after an intimate boxing session with Dyson, celebrates at The Dal with Kenzi. While gone the Clubhouse is robbed. Kenzi reveals her debt to Massimo for her Fae magic. He agrees to return their possessions if they retrieve a rare herb from Lauren's apartment, where they are trapped by magic and Bo is attacked by a Gargoyle. Kenzi admits to Bo that she kissed Dyson and is in love with Hale. Meanwhile, Lauren and Crystal are imprisoned inside a basement cell. Lauren reveals that she has a brother and they decided to "change the world." Their cause had turned into blowing up pipelines as eco-terrorists. In one explosion eleven people were killed that weren't supposed to have been there. Lauren (then known as Karen Beattie) then became a fugitive, changing identity, and being on the run ever since. Bo delivers the herb to Massimo and finds Tamsin tied-up. When Bo chi-sucks him she discovers he is human. He wanted a lock of Tamsin's hair needed for his "mommy." Bo grabs the hair and throws it into a cauldron of lava, Massimo drops into the cauldron to retrieve it. Bo is at a makeshift meeting with the Una Mens. The Keeper of the Una Mens tells Bo that she is not a danger to them any longer, for her blood had chosen the Dark.
53	5	"Let the Dark Times Roll"	Ron Murphy	Jeremy Boxen	December 8, 2013
Bo finds out that she is Dark Fae and must pay fealty to the leader of the Dark. While talking to the Una Mens, Bo tries to chi-suck the room, but it turns into an unwilling game for Bo as they boomerang back their own chi and take a little extra from her for good measure. Bo decides to meet the Dark Fae leader but unfortunately for her, Evony is once again the Morrigan. Bo agrees to locate Vex so that he can explain what happened to her, but it turns out the Morrigan's archivist had the answers all along. Meanwhile, Trick is summoned by the Una Mens for a personal inquisition. Their conversation reveals the origins of the Una Mens, who declare Trick the new acting Ash, but they remain mercifully unaware of his status as the Blood King.
54	6	"Of All the Gin Joints"	Mairzee Almas	Alex Zarowney	December 15, 2013
Mysterious singer Ianka holds the key to Bo's lost memories but she demands her freedom in return. Meanwhile, The Morrigan pays a visit to Lauren, but it's not to negotiate the terms of Lauren's employment by the Dark: it's a social call.
55	7	"La Fae Époque"	Steve DiMarco	Michael Grassi	December 22, 2013
When the Una Mens take Dyson to execute him for his past crimes, Bo enters Dyson's memories with help from an Oracle, some talismans from Trick, and Lauren's new Dark Fae equipment. While captured, Dyson promises to teach Kenzi to be a Shadow Thief in recognition of her services to the Fae.
56	8	"Groundhog Fae"	Ron Murphy	Emily Andras & Sam Ruano	December 29, 2013
Bo's friends are too busy celebrating Yule to notice she's missing. But when the night starts repeating itself, Bo and Tamsin – now with most of her memories intact – make it their mission to stop it. Meanwhile, Lauren and Dyson disagree over a mysterious package addressed to Bo, much to Vex's amusement, and Kenzi and Hale prepare to spend their first night together.
57	9	"Destiny's Child"	Steve DiMarco	Steve Cochrane	January 12, 2014
Bo joins a supernatural Crow to find the answers she seeks in Irkalla, where she becomes trapped in a game of riddles with the amoral Leviathan. After dealing with the foreseen betrayal of the Crow, Bo once again gets back on the train, meeting the Wanderer, a man named Rainer, who she introduces to everyone as her destiny. Meanwhile, Kenzi is determined to uncover what Trick's hiding.
58	10	"Waves"	Director X	Michael Grassi	January 19, 2014
Still reeling from Bo's revelation, Kenzi signs Lauren and Dyson up for an undercover mission at a mysterious corporation. They later discover that the culprits of their mission, several cases of leg-stealing, are mermaids. Meanwhile, Bo and Rainer reminisce as they go up against the Una Mens, finally killing them once and for all.
59	11	"End Of A Line"	Ron Murphy	Steve Cochrane	January 26, 2014
Tamsin's mentor Acacia resurfaces when Revenants attack Bo. Hale invites Kenzi's mom and cousin to visit to witness a momentous event, his proposal, which later turns to a falling-out between Kenzi and her mom discussing the past. Dyson questions Rainer's intentions. Bo learns the devastating truth of the Leviathan's warning. Trying to protect Kenzi from Massimo, Hale dies.
60	12	"Origin"	Steve DiMarco	Alexandra Zarowny	February 9, 2014
Bo is reluctant to comply with her role in a prophecy foretold by an order of Knights, until advice from a surprising source helps her make a difficult decision. The Morrigan reveals that Massimo is her human son, and when Kenzi tries to get even against him she is stopped by Vex, who was made Massimo's guardian after the Morrigan gave him to Vex when he was a little boy. Lauren, who had procured the Morrigan's DNA, created a serum with it and turned the Morrigan into a human.
61	13	"Dark Horse"	Ron Murphy	Emily Andras	February 16, 2014
Massimo strives to make his mother proud by beheading Bo, whose heart must be sacrificed to close the portal to the underworld. After eating the seed containing all the powers of the dead Una Mens, Massimo goes to the Dal, kills Rainer, and beats up Bo. Bo kills Massimo after Lauren seized the Twig of Zamora that protected him and destroyed it. Kenzi discovers that she is Bo's heart, and walks into the portal, sacrificing herself.

== Webisodes ==
A series of four webisodes were created as a promotional lead-in to the premiere of Season Four on Showcase, with the first installment announced on October 11 two days before its release. They are collectively described as "SEASON 3.5".

No.	Title	Directed by	Written by	Original release date
1	"UPYURS6"	Paul Day	Alexandra Zarowny	October 13, 2013
Alongside Bruce, Kenzi seeks out the Druid Massimo, when their travel is interrupted by an internet troll who denies passage across a bridge.
2	"Red Tape"	Paul Day	Michael Grassi	October 20, 2013
Vex runs into a few problems while trying to arrange a party.
3	"Getting to Know You: The Una Mens"	Steve Cochrane	Steve Cochrane	October 27, 2013
An old timey video introducing The Una Mens: a powerful group of Fae elders created after the disappearance of The Blood King who use lethal means to enforce the Blood Laws.
4	"Prophecy"	Paul Day	Sam Ruano	November 3, 2013
In The Dal Riata, Hale bets Trick that a Divination Plank is no better than a Magic 8 Ball, unwittingly becomes possessed, and delivers an ominous prophecy.

== Reception and popularity ==
In an exclusive selection of the best Canadian television shows of 2013, Lost Girl was rated "Number 6" by some of Canada's top critics and television editors in Canada's Best in Show by TV Guide (Canada).

HuffPost Canada ranked Lost Girl as the "Number 4" television show in its Best Canadian TV Of 2013.

In the annual AfterEllen Visibility Awards, Lost Girl, Lauren Lewis, and Zoie Palmer won the categories in which they were candidates for year 2013.

At the 2014 Canadian Screen Awards, Lost Girl won the Fan Choice Award for Favourite Canadian Show and Zoie Palmer won the Fan Choice Award for Favourite Canadian Screen Star.

== Home media release ==
The Season 4 DVD and Blu-ray for Region 1 (Canada and U.S.) was released by Giant Ape Media (Funimation SC) on June 24, 2014. In the United Kingdom and Ireland (Region 2), Sony Pictures Home Entertainment released the DVD of Season 4 on May 19, 2014.
