= Lost Girl season 3 =

Lost Girl
- Season 3
- North America DVD cover
- No. of episodes: 13

Release
- Original network: Showcase
- Original release: January 6 – April 14, 2013

Season chronology
- ← Previous; Season 2 Next → Season 4

Lost Girl is a Canadian supernatural drama television series that premiered on Showcase on September 12, 2010. The series was created by Michelle Lovretta and is produced by Jay Firestone and Prodigy Pictures Inc., with the participation of the Canadian Television Fund (Canada Media Fund), and in association with Shaw Media. It follows the life of a bisexual succubus named Bo, played by Anna Silk, as she learns to control her superhuman abilities, help those in need, and discover the truth about her origins.

On December 9, 2011, Showcase announced that Lost Girl had been renewed for a third season. Season Three premiered on January 6, 2013.

In Australia, Season Three premiered on SF (formerly Sci Fi) on January 10, 2013. In the United States, Season Three premiered on Syfy on January 14, 2013. In the United Kingdom and Ireland, Season Three premiered on Syfy (UK) on April 23, 2013.

== Plot ==
One hair from someone she loves. Two from someone she trusts. And three from her own head. Put them in the bottle and the Druid will do the rest.

— Acacia, Delinquents (3.10)

With Fae society in upheaval, Bo finds herself facing further changes and challenges as former ally Hale becomes the acting Ash – trying to forge a new balance between Light and Dark by appointing a Valkyrie aligned with the Dark Fae, Tamsin, as Dyson's new detective partner. Meantime, Tamsin is a secret agent working for two separate clients: The Morrigan, who wants to build a case against Bo so that she can execute her; and as a mercenary for someone who wants to entrap Bo. Matters become complicated when Kenzi is kidnapped by a crazed Kitsune who assumes her identity and deliberately sows distrust in the relationships between Bo and those closest to her; just as Bo must prepare for and go through an evolutionary Fae rite of passage that forces her to explore her past and future. Danger escalates when a human scientist convinces a despondent Lauren to join him in conducting scientific research in his private laboratory – all the while deceptively concealing his intent to harness Fae genetics for himself with the use of her expertise. The third season culminates with Bo being engulfed by black smoke and disappearing into thin air, presumably whisked away by her mysterious and powerful biological father (who may be "The Wanderer" that recurred throughout the season's story arc).

== Cast and characters ==
=== Main cast ===
- Anna Silk as Bo
- Kris Holden-Ried as Dyson
- Ksenia Solo as Kenzi
- Zoie Palmer as Dr. Lauren Lewis
- Rick Howland as Fitzpatrick "Trick" McCorrigan
- K. C. Collins as Hale Santiago

=== Recurring cast ===
- Emmanuelle Vaugier as Evony Fleurette Marquise: The Morrigan.
- Paul Amos as Vex: a Mesmer.
- Rachel Skarsten as Tamsin: a Valkyrie.
- Shawn Doyle as Dr. Isaac Taft: a psychotic human scientist and Fae hunter.
- Deborah Odell as Stella Nashira: a Lodestar.
- Rob Archer as Bruce: a bodyguard and hatchet man for The Morrigan (species unknown).
- Inga Cadranel as Aife: a Succubus and Bo's birth mother.
- Tim Rozon as Massimo: The Druid.

== Production ==
Naming Lost Girl its "highest rated drama series", Showcase announced the renewal for a third season on December 9, 2011, with production beginning in Spring 2012.

Prodigy Pictures announced the start of principal photography on Season Three on April 17, 2012, with the season premiere slated for Fall 2012.

On July 12, 2012, Showcase announced Season Three would premiere in Winter 2013 (i.e. early 2013).

Syfy confirmed the January 14, 2013, U.S. premiere of Season Three in a general press release on November 12, 2012. The following day (November 13), Showcase announced the Canadian premiere date of January 6, 2013.

== Broadcast special ==
Lost Girl ConFAEdential, a special roundtable discussion about the previous two seasons and characters, aired on Showcase before the premiere of Season Three on January 6, 2013. Moderated by Jay Firestone, Executive Producer of Lost Girl, it featured (in order of introduction): Rick Howland ("Trick"), Zoie Palmer ("Dr. Lauren Lewis"), Anna Silk ("Bo"), Kris Holden-Ried ("Dyson"), Ksenia Solo ("Kenzi"), and K.C. Collins ("Hale").

== Episodes ==
No. overall	No. in season	Title	Directed by	Written by	Original release date	CAN viewers (millions) (Note: Canada ratings results)
36	1	"Caged Fae"	Paolo Barzman	Emily Andras	January 6, 2013	N/A
It is three weeks after the defeat of The Garuda and Bo is out of control breaking many Fae laws and going on a rampage through the city. She is arrested by Dyson and sent to jail for her actions. However, this is a ruse to investigate the Fae women's prison that is run by Amazons and the warden in charge, with Lauren undercover as the prison doctor. Hale is revealed to be the new acting Ash. Vex attempts to convince Dyson to take him on as a partner in Hale's place. Bo discovers that the warden is forcing other rare Fae to bear children against their will at a highly accelerated rate so she can sell them. Bo finds out that the warden is a Liderc female impostor, and the Amazons exact their revenge on him. Bo and Lauren decide to take a shot at a committed relationship. They kiss as Kenzi and Dyson look on. At the end of the episode Bo attacks a man outside The Dal and drains his chi, leaving him unconscious as she walks away with an evil smile.
37	2	"SubterrFaenean"	Steve DiMarco	Stephen Cochrane	January 13, 2013	N/A
Kenzi attends an art festival and witnesses a friend vanish. Kenzi asks Bo to help her and they discover a den of Alligator Fae led by a Fae named Atticus who appears to threaten to reveal the Fae to the human world. Dyson, with Hale's help, discovers that the Alligator Fae are threatened by a Pied Piper (also referred to within the show as the Slender Man) who wants them killed to allow for his own political and economic gains. Bo's involvement leads to her bringing the Piper to Atticus and the two face off against each other. Lauren and Bo's relationship continues to grow. Bo experiences dreams of her attacking others. Trick contacts a Weaver to try to help Bo with her dreams. The Weaver does so and discovers an image of Bo in a monstrous form feeding. Dyson gets a new partner, Tamsin, who is Dark Fae. But the two are immediately at odds with each other and Tamsin accuses Bo of feeding on a Dark Fae and shows evidence to that effect.
38	3	"ConFaegion"	Paolo Barzman	James Thorpe	January 20, 2013	N/A
Bo recovers a Staff of Righteousness which had been stolen. Vex tries to make amends with the Morrigan but fails to do so. She plants a parasite on Vex which enters Bo, Dyson, and Tamsin changing their personalities and regressing them so their Fae powers no longer exist. Kenzi picks up the Staff to defend herself and cannot let go of it. The staff gives Kenzi Fae-like abilities, but Trick gives Kenzi a means to be free. Kenzi and Lauren come to odds over Bo, but manage to overcome this saving Bo and the others. Afterwards, Vex decides it is time to leave, and Hale confronts the Morrigan and warns her not to threaten the peace again.
39	4	"Fae-de To Black"	Ron Murphy	Alexandra Zarowny	January 27, 2013	N/A
Dyson asks Bo to go undercover as a therapist to investigate a rash of human suicides. Bo believes at first that a Suicide Fae working at the clinic is feeding on the victims, but after that Fae dies, Dyson goes undercover as a patient and falls victim to what is happening. Bo discovers a Rakshasa in the form of a cat is responsible for the deaths. Bo being monogamous with Lauren and chi-feeding from her only is causing problems. Lauren is becoming weaker and Bo is unable to sustain herself sufficiently. After being severely injured she is forced to feed from Dyson. Bo tells Lauren what happened and Lauren sets some ground rules: Bo can feed on others, but not Dyson. Kenzi tries to talk to the others about the rash on her arm and how it's getting worse, but no one listens and at the end of the episode is pulled into darkness by an unseen force.
40	5	"Faes Wide Shut"	George Mihalka	Jeremy Boxen	February 10, 2013	N/A
Bo and Lauren attempt to find a way to satisfy Bo's needs which means looking for sexual partners at the Dal Riata. Kenzi's personality seems to change, becoming cold in how she deals with others and not acting like her normal self and she drives wedges between her friends lying to make them doubt each other. Dyson and Tamsin investigate a Fae murder and discover that Bo may be responsible as she was with that Fae previously. Bo investigates why humans are turning into puddles of goo after visiting an adult club that is owned by a Bacchus, They discover that a Manta, a huge octopus-like underFae is causing the deaths in connection with the Bacchus. Bo loses control, but Lauren manages to bring her back with some difficulty. Dyson decides to take the investigation of Bo further as the evidence seems to be pointing to her killing Fae and Lauren covering for Bo. Bo realizes that Kenzi isn't who she appears to be and demands to know where the real Kenzi is.
41	6	"The Kenzi Scale"	David Greene	Sandra Chwialkowska	February 17, 2013	N/A
The false Kenzi convinces the others to imprison Bo in the Dal Riata. It turns out that the real Kenzi is being held prisoner by a Kitsune who has taken over her life. She did so because the liquid that spilled on Kenzi when she attacked the Norn gave Kenzi the Kitsune’s powers. The Kitsune abducted Kenzi in order to recover her power and then made herself into a copy of Kenzi. Tamsin however uncovers the fake Kenzi and helps Bo to escape and then rescue the real Kenzi. The Kitsune attacks Dyson and he kills her which allows Lauren to also confirm the deception. Tamsin is told by the Morrigan to wake the Dark Fae who is in a coma so he can identify Bo as his attacker. Tamsin wakes the Fae who identifies Bo as his attacker but she does not give The Morrigan this information. Lauren discovers that something is changing Bo’s body and replacing it cell by cell. Trick reveals that Bo is facing The Dawning, which is the evolution of Fae. If Bo fails this test she will become an UnderFae instead.
42	7	"There's Bo Place Like Home"	Gail Harvey	Brendon Yorke	March 3, 2013	N/A
Trick trains Bo to face her first challenge but she fails. A Lode Star tells Bo that she must return home to her human parents and settle her past with them. Bo finds her father has died and her mother is suffering from dementia. Bo discovers that an UnderFae, called Lady Polly by the locals, is killing off those in her home town that had released it in the past as they return for a cherry festival. Bo collects the remainder of her high school friends together to trap the UnderFae with the help of Kenzi in a well ending the threat. Bo speaks with her mother, apologizes to her, forgives her and manages to come to terms with her past at last. Bo passes the first test and discovers there is much more to come and she confronts Kenzi asking her why she went to see The Norn.
43	8	"Fae-ge Against The Machine"	George Mihalka	Alexandra Zarowny	March 10, 2013	N/A
Bo accidentally activates a game that is part of her tests for The Dawning. Bo and Tamsin are forced into helping a Spriggan to find a missing Fae. As Bo is involved in that search, Trick is forced to play the game for Bo. Each choice Trick makes affects Bo at some point in her search. Bo and Tamsin go to Brazenwood, a place where outlaw Fae live and find the missing Fae who is a Squonk and free her. Lauren wins an award for her work and wants Bo to go with her, instead going out with a fellow scientist when Bo cannot do so. Bo passes her test and receives an invitation to attend The Dawning and Tamsin kisses Bo and has a disturbing revelation about Bo.
44	9	"Ceremony"	Lee Rose	James Thorpe	March 17, 2013	N/A
Bo’s Dawning arrives and she enters the Temple alongside Dyson with Lauren’s blessing. They enter a mirror of the world they know in search of a key to escape it. Dyson reveals that he does love Bo but will not interfere with her and Lauren’s happiness, content to wait for her. As the trial continues the world twists further and further, roles changing and altering from what Bo knows. Dyson realizes that he is the key to escape and forces Bo to kill him. They return to the real world and Bo changes as she did in Season Two when Lauren’s life was threatened pulling the Chi from everyone around her and uses it to revive Dyson. Bo passes the Dawning, but a new threat is hinted at still to come.
45	10	"Delinquents"	Gail Harvey	Michelle Lovretta	March 24, 2013	N/A
Bo, Kenzi and Dyson go undercover in a troubled youth camp to investigate a series of deaths and discover that a Tikbalang is killing them and stop it. However, it had a human mate who attacks Lauren in revenge, but Bo saves her. Tamsin is contacted by a bounty hunter friend, Acacia (Linda Hamilton), who informs her that someone Tamsin is working for wants her to bring Bo to him. Tamsin does not want to and resists until her friend is killed. Tamsin plants doubt in Lauren about Bo and as a result of this and the attack on her, Lauren tells Bo that they need a break in their relationship. Bo understands this and walks away sadly. As all of this unfolds, Tamsin prepares to capture Bo and take her to the one that wants Bo.
46	11	"Adventures In Fae-bysitting"	Lee Rose	Sandra Chwialkowska	March 31, 2013	N/A
Bo is approached by a babysitter who claims that something happened to her employer. Dyson is approached by a Fae who lost contact with her twin sister and believes something happened. Bo discovers the babysitter is a Duppy, and a coven of witches have taken control of her. Bo stops them with some mysterious help, and then, at the behest of the babysitter, kills her so she cannot be used again. Tamsin and Dyson go over the kills that were assumed to be Bo’s and find someone is killing mass numbers of Fae, but do not know who. Lauren is offered a job, but after her past is investigated, it appears that she is a fugitive from the law. She decides to make a break with the Fae and leaves, severing her connections with them completely.
47	12	"Hail, Hale"	Steve DiMarco	Stephen Cochrane	April 7, 2013	N/A
Hale’s inauguration arrives but Dyson is kidnapped by a group of humans. This allows The Morrigan to discredit Hale because the label on a vial of poison has Lauren's name on it, implicating Lauren in the attack, and she is missing. Through this The Morrigan forces a vote of 'no confidence' against Hale's leadership and declares that all humans held by the Fae, or connected with the Fae, are terrorists. As a result, Kenzi is arrested and sentenced to death. Lauren realizes she has been deceived by Dr. Taft who has harbored a plan against the Fae for 40 years, which reveals that he is the one who has been hunting Fae and experimenting on them. Lauren is imprisoned in a cell next to Dyson and they discover that Aife is also being held prisoner, but she has become mentally unbalanced. Trick is kidnapped by unknown persons, while Tamsin is shot as she and Bo find the compound to where they traced calls from Lauren's cellphone.
48	13	"Those Who Wander"	Ron Murphy	Emily Andras	April 14, 2013	0,269
Kenzi escapes with the Morrigan's henchman, Bruce, and goes in search of the Druid to become Fae. Dr. Isaac Taft is going to use Dyson’s stem cells to turn himself into Wolf Fae. Lauren agrees to perform the transplant if he lets Bo go unharmed, but it's later revealed that she sabotaged Taft by injecting stem cells from the Cabbit Fae instead. Bo and Tamsin free the imprisoned Faes, including Aife who is stabbed by Taft when she jumps in front of Bo and is forced to stay behind. Taft flees but Dyson hunts him down, reveals Lauren's sabotage, then kills him. Hale rescues Trick who leaves with Stella for Scotland as Vex takes out the Morrigan for Hale. Bo and Tamsin battle, but ends by her siding with Bo. Tamsin gets Dyson and on their way back the Wanderer figure appears in the middle of the road; she tries to run him down but the truck flies over the edge of the road. Bo is at the Dal, and the Wanderer – possibly her father – spirits her away to a place unknown.

== Season 3.5 ==
See Lost Girl season 4#Webisodes

== Reception and popularity ==
"Bo and Lauren" was named Top TV Couple of 2013 by E! Online (E! Entertainment Television), with its competition in the annual popularity contest compared to a "David versus Goliath".

On February 14, 2013, a CNN (Cable News Network) broadcast of the twenty, past and present, favorite couples in television included "Bo and Lauren" as couple "Number 9" in the list.

"Lauren Lewis" was chosen "Number 1" by AfterEllen in its November 2013 survey of The Top 25 Lesbian/Bi Characters on TV (Right Now). "Bo" was named "Number 7" in the list.

== Home media release ==
The DVD and Blu-ray of Season 3 was released by Giant Ape Media (Funimation SC) in Region 1 (Canada and U.S.) on November 19, 2013. In Australia (Region 4), Sony Pictures Home Entertainment released the DVD of Season 3 on December 5, 2013. In the United Kingdom and Ireland (Region 2), Sony Pictures Home Entertainment released the Season 3 DVD on March 3, 2014.
