= Love Thy Neighbor (2006 film) =

2006 TV movie with Alexandra Paul

Love Thy Neighbor is a Canadian made-for-TV thriller movie directed by Paul Schneider, originally released for the United States in 2006.

== Plot ==
The main protagonist, Laura Benson (Alexandra Paul) and her family (Gary Hudson and Ksenia Solo), move to a new gated community after a violent break and enter. After a series of unfortunate and suspicions events, Laura starts to suspect her over-friendly neighbor is to blame.

== Cast ==
- Alexandra Paul – Laura Benson
- Shannon Lawson – Janis Rivers
- Gary Hudson – Jim Benson
- Ksenia Solo – Erin Benson
- Rod Crowley – Crowley
- John Bourgeois – Detective Zeller
- Michelle Killoran – Jenny Rivers
- John Jarvis – Alan Rivers
- Scott Wickware – Coach Brand
- James Binkley – Shooter
- Sean Baek – Accomplice / Jack Kim
- Ricardo Betancourt – Assistant
- Barbara Gordon – Micky Gallaghan
- Tomoko Siu – Streetgirl
- Justine Campbell – Waitress
- Paul Stephen – Principal Bennet
- Diego Fuentes – ACS Officer
- Nicole Mauffrey – Receptionist (uncredited)

== Crew ==
- Julian Grant – producer
- Michael Jacobs – executive producer
- Fernando Szew – executive producer
- Norman Orenstein – music
- J.P. Locherer (Joseph Locherer) – cinematographer
- Ben Wilkinson – film editor
- Lindsay Chag – casting
- Brian Levy – casting

== Technical ==
- Filming location – Guelph, Ontario, Canada
- Production Company – LTN Productions INC.
- Runtime – 89 minutes
- Rating - TV-PG
