= Hungry for You =

- Directed by: Dimitri Logothetis
- Produced by: Gary Hudson
- Starring: Michael Phenicie; Rochelle Swanson; Gary Wood; Nancy Hochman; Ritchie Montgomery; Michael Gregory; Johnny Lage; Mark Twogood
- Cinematography: Nicholas Josef von Sternberg
- Edited by: Gareth O'Neil
- Music by: Joel Hirschhorn
- Release date: 1996
- Running time: 92 minutes
- Country: United States
- Language: English

Hungry for You is a 1996 American erotic thriller and science fiction film directed by Dimitri Logothetis and produced by Gary Hudson. This film has music composed by Joel Hirschhorn. The film stars: Michael Phenicie, Rochelle Swanson, Gary Wood, Nancy Hochman and Ritchie Montgomery in the lead roles.

== Cast ==
- Michael Phenicie as Rodney
- Rochelle Swanson as Viva
- Gary Wood as Brannagan
- Nancy Hochman as Val
- Ritchie Montgomery as Arnold
- Michael Gregory as Jack
- Johnny Lage as Joe
- Mark Twogood as Bull Rider
