= Ritchie Montgomery =

American actor

- Born: March 23, 1954 (age 72); Natchez, Mississippi, USA
- Occupation: Actor
- Years active: 1974–present

Ritchie Montgomery (born March 23, 1954) is an American actor. He is best known for his supporting roles in the films The Princess and the Frog (2009) and Texas Chainsaw 3D (2013). He portrayed Horace Logan on the CBS miniseries Elvis (2005).

== Career ==
Montgomery began his film career with an uncredited role in Huckleberry Finn (1974).

In 2009, Montgomery had a supporting voice role as Reggie in the Disney animated film The Princess and the Frog. In July 2011, he joined the cast of Texas Chainsaw 3D, a direct sequel to The Texas Chain Saw Massacre (1974). The film was released in January 2013.

In June 2018, Montgomery joined the cast of The Christmas Contract, a Lifetime television film. The film was released in December. In January 2025, Montgomery starred in the horror film Bone Face.

== Filmography ==
=== Film ===
Year	Title	Role	Notes
1974	Huckleberry Finn	Man On Horse	Uncredited
1976	Ode to Billy Joe	Townie	Uncredited
1984	R.S.V.P.	Photographer	Television film
1986	Monster in the Closet	Deputy Spiro	
1987	Ray's Male Heterosexual Dance Hall	Dancer	Uncredited; short film
1988	Two Idiots in Hollywood	Perry White / Sergeant Rose	
1988	The River Pirates		
1992	The Player	Himself	Uncredited
1993	Quick	Trucking Foreman	
1994	Body Shot	Young Guard	
1996	Hungry for You	Arnold	
1996	Cheyenne	Foley	
1997	Old Man	Deputy	Television film
1997	Sisters and Other Strangers	Moe	Television film
1998	Yakima Wash	Biloxi	
2000	South of Heaven, West of Hell	Harold	
2000	Vice	Mr. Powell	
2001	Chasing Destiny	Can't Get Laid	Television film
2001	Above & Beyond	Kyle	
2001	Malpractice	Bradley	
2001	Daddy and Them	Preacher	
2001	Monster's Ball	Detective	
2002	Britney, Baby, One More Time	Lighting Guy 2	
2002	Crossroads	Customer	
2002	The Badge	Trucker	
2002	Catch Me If You Can	Young Doctor	
2004	Knuckle Sandwich	Officer Randy	
2004	Heart of the Storm	Tad	
2005	Heartless	Detective Steve Syler	
2005	The Dukes of Hazzard	Trooper	
2005	Glorious Mail	Brother Oral Buchanan	
2005	Snow Wonder	Kirk	
2006	Glory Road	Texas Western Booster	
2006	Come Early Morning	Bob	
2006	Not Like Everyone Else	Henry Bracken	
2006	Road House 2	Embry Davis	
2006	Deja Vu	Agent #1	
2007	Premonition	Funeral Attendant	
2007	The Mist	Paisley Hat Man	Uncredited
2007	Cleaner	George Walton	
2007	The Great Debaters	Deputy	
2007	Blonde Ambition	Mr. Carruthers	
2008	Deal	Man At Bar	
2008	The Last Lullaby	Bruno	
2008	Soul Men	Emmett, The Drunk	
2008	The Librarian: Curse of the Judas Chalice		Uncredited
2009	In the Electric Mist	Club Leon Bartender	
2009	Cirque du Freak: The Vampire's Assistant	Pastor	
2009	Nine Dead	Vincent Perez	
2009	The Princess and the Frog	Reggie	Voice role
2010	The Chameleon	Diner Owner	
2010	Two Gates of Sleep	Dr. Benjamin	
2010	Legendary	PA Announcer	
2010	Red	Pharmacist	Uncredited
2010	Monsterwolf	Holter Ex-Driver	
2011	My Future Boyfriend	Antoine Lemieux	
2011	Mask Maker	Sheriff	
2011	Worst. Prom. Ever.	Principal Nutter	Television film
2011	Green Lantern	Bunker Doctor	
2011	The Help	Bus Driver	
2011	Storm War	Security Guard	
2012	Contraband	Sebastian's Cousin	
2012	Lay the Favorite	Jackie	
2012	Jayne Mansfield's Car	Bucky	
2012	Meeting Evil	Suburban Cop #2	
2012	The Lucky One	Cottage Owner	
2012	Abraham Lincoln: Vampire Hunter	Guest #1	
2012	The Baytown Outlaws	Officer Brown	
2012	Looper	Bodega Owner	
2012	Playing for Keeps	The Owner of The Sports Shop	
2012	Django Unchained	Overseer Johnny Jerome	
2013	Texas Chainsaw 3D	Ollie Brown	
2013	Shadow People	Jim "Sparky" Taylor	
2013	The Hot Flashes	Roy	
2013	2 Guns	The Chief of Police	
2013	12 Years a Slave	Roadman	Uncredited
2013	Alligator Alley	Lucien Doucette	
2013	White Rabbit	Walt	
2013	Homefront	Mechanic	
2014	Wicked Blood	Hank	
2014	13 Sins	Apartment Manager	
2014	Bad Country	Nady Grace	
2014	Get On Up	The Warden	Uncredited
2015	A Sort of Homecoming	Amy's Father	
2015	Pitch Perfect 2	Emcee At Belle	Uncredited
2015	Heist	Jono	
2015	Evan's Crime	Motel Manager	
2016	Christine	"Tug"	
2016	The Whole Truth	Judge Robichaux	
2016	Smothered	Mountain Man	
2016	Elvis & Nixon	Grady (Airport Security)	
2016	Showing Roots	Pip	
2016	Free State of Jones	Third Man	Uncredited
2016	The Magnificent Seven	Gavin David	
2016	Strange Weather	Officer Monroe	
2016	Dead South	Ferris	
2017	Kidnap	Bugman	
2017	Trailer Park Shark	Uncle Jeff	Television film
2017	The Hammer	Warden Barry	
2017	Geostorm	Mike	
2017	Cut Off	Officer Guidry	
2018	Blaze	T.J.	
2018	Santa Jaws	Papa Joe	
2018	I Wrote This for You	Rude Guest	
2018	The Christmas Contract	Rocky	Television film
2019	The Last Laugh	Texas Comic	
2019	Wounds	Italian American Man	
2019	Lost Bayou	"Peanut"	
2019	Hallowed Ground	Sandy	
2019	Our Friend	Ted	
2019	A Christmas Wish	Mr. Porter	Television film
2020	The Eagle and the Albatross	Billy	
2020	One of These Days	Clint	
2020	The Dinner Party	Brooks	
2020	The Secrets We Keep	Mitchell	
2021	Mona Lisa and the Blood Moon	Older Man	
2021	Every Time a Bell Rings	Captain Ron / Santa	Television film
2022	Samaritan	Cashier	
2022	Mindcage	Father Linares	
2023	Devil's Peak	Ed	
2023	From Black	Kidnapper / Support Group	
2023	The Getback	Gus	
2023	South of Sanity	Stank	
2023	Hit Man	Marcus	
2023	Rumble Through the Dark	Rhett	
2024	Lisa Frankenstein	Old Man Harvey	
2025	Bone Face	Charlie	
2025	The Ritual	Chester	

=== Television ===
Year	Title	Role	Notes
1980	Beulah Land	Bloody Man	Episode: "Episode II"
1981	Code Red	Cab Driver	Episode: "Code Red"
1983	The Yellow Rose	Gas Station Attendant	Episode: "The Yellow Rose"
1983	Simon & Simon	Cabbie	Episode: "Fly the Alibi Skies"
1983	T.J. Hooker	Mickey Stack	Episode: "Undercover Affair"
1983; 1985	The Dukes of Hazzard	Elton	2 episodes
1984	Whiz Kids	Store Clerk	Episode: "The Lollypop Gang Strikes Back"
1984	Mickey Spillane's Mike Hammer	Dale	Episode: "The Perfect Twenty"
1984	Hill Street Blues	Worker	Episode: "Ewe and Me, Babe"
1984	Murder, She Wrote	Busboy	Episode: "Death Casts a Spell"
1986	Starman	Gas Station Attendant	Episode: "The Gift"
1986; 1989	Designing Women	Lyle / Minister	2 episodes
1991	Evening Shade	Doyle / Thurman	2 episodes
1993	Hearts Afire	Richard	2 episodes
1995	Home Improvement	Delivery Man	Episode: "Doctor in the House"
1996	Married... with Children	Emcee	Episode: "The Juggs Have Left the Building"
1996	The Big Easy	Dex	Episode: "Snake Dance"
1997–1998; 2002–2003	Days of Our Lives	Evil Voice / Motel Clerk / Junior Johnson / Radio Announcer	6 episodes
1998	Mike Hammer, Private Eye	Herb Liebmann	Episode: "Dump the Creep"
2002	ER	Cahill	Episode: "Orion in the Sky"
2003	Carnivàle	Patrolman	Episode: "The River"
2005	Elvis	Horace Logan	Miniseries
2007	The Riches	Ed Kurtz	Episode: "Pilot"
2011	Clunkers	Officer D. Clark	Main role
2011	Memphis Beat	Naked Man	Episode: "Flesh and Blood"
2012	Breakout Kings	Dave	Episode: "I Smell Emmy"
2013	American Horror Story: Coven	Stunt Zombie #3	2 episodes
2013	Bonnie & Clyde	Turner	Episode: "Part 1"
2013	Treme	King of the Krewe of Nutria	Episode: "...To Miss New Orleans"
2014	True Detective	Henry Olivier	Episode: "The Locked Room"
2015–2016	One Mississippi	Mick	2 episodes
2016	Still the King	Bodean	Episode: "A Family, a Fair"
2016	Quarry	Pete Hogan	Episode: "Nuoc Chay Da Mon"
2018	Baskets	Rambling Cowboy	3 episodes
2018	Ozark	Devereaux	Episode: "The Precious Blood of Jesus"
2020	Paradise Lost	Dickie Sr.	Episode: "The Black Dog Barked"
2020	P-Valley	Vale, The Bail Bondsman	Episode: "Belly"
2020	South of Sanity	Stank	2 episodes
2020	The Good Lord Bird	Alderman	Episode: "Jesus Is Walkin'"
2021	The Underground Railroad	Rural Bartender	Episode: "Chapter 2: South Carolina"
2021	Leverage: Redemption	Dennis	Episode: "The Rollin' on the River Job"
2022	Salvage Marines	The Administrator	Main role
2022	Tales	Steve	Episode: "Put It on Me"
2022	Panhandle	Buddy	Episode: "Machetes Out"
2023	Twisted Metal	Haggard Loner	Episode: "CRZSRDS"
