= Diego Fuentes (actor) =

Canadian actor

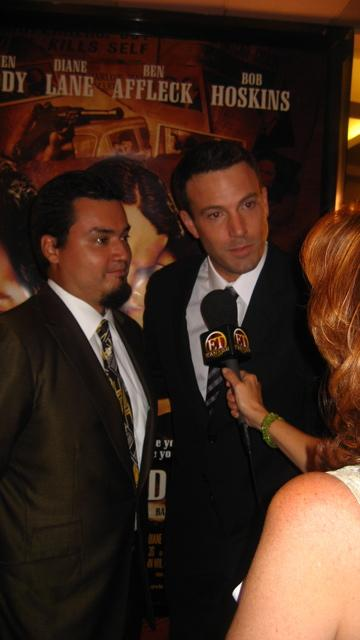
Diego Fuentes and Ben Affleck at the 2007 premiere of the film Hollywoodland, in which they both appeared

Diego Antonio Fuentes Lopez, known as Diego Fuentes, is a Canadian actor of Chilean descent.

== MuchMusic ==
Fuentes was MuchMusic's first ever VJ Search winner in 1995, going on to host the popular Clip Trip show on MuchMusic's sister station, MuchMoreMusic.

== Acting ==
Most notably, Fuentes portrayed real-life actor Natividad Vacio in the 2007 film Hollywoodland. He played fan-favourite Bruno Dias on Global TV's medical drama, Remedy from 2014 to 2015.

In 2011, he appeared in the Drive One Series commercials of Ford Cars, stating the catchphrase "Who wants to stop for gas? I don't."

== Music ==
Fuentes was a resident DJ on "Terrible Tuesdays" at the then popular Queenshead Pub in Toronto from 2003 to 2005. He originally performed under his own name, then adopted the moniker "Mexico 2000".

== Curling ==
Fuentes is a curler. In high school, he and his school curling team competed at OFSAA.

On May 12, 2012, Fuentes was lead skip of a local curling team that won the Gabby's 2012 annual Bonspiel held at the High Park Curling Club. The team completed the tournament with 4 wins, 0 losses and 0 ties.

In January 2016, Fuentes stated in an interview that "curling is an incredible sport because drinking is involved".

== Advocacy and public service ==
Fuentes is a known advocate for customer rights in fast food restaurants and taxi services in the Greater Toronto Area, as well as a staunch supporter of water conservation.

Throughout 2015, he championed a campaign to feed the homeless and clean up Toronto city streets known as "Mexico's Children". In early December, there was an incident outside a Toronto Coffee Time where he was reportedly spit on after offering a woman a bagel with cream cheese. The police were called but no charges or arrests were made.

== Filmography ==
- Ice (1998 TV) as Zapata
- Held up 1999
- Love Thy Neighbor
- Remedy (TV series) (2014 TV)
- Caught (2018) as Lt. Carillo
