= After Alice =

2000 film directed by Paul Marcus

- Directed by: Paul Marcus
- Written by: Jeff Miller
- Produced by: Tom Kinninmont; André Paquette; Tina Stern
- Starring: Kiefer Sutherland; Henry Czerny; Polly Walker
- Cinematography: Brian Pearson
- Edited by: Kate Evans; Liz Webber
- Music by: Michael Hoenig
- Production companies: Videal GmBH; Promark Entertainment Group
- Distributed by: Trimark Pictures
- Release date: October 24, 2000; (DVD)
- Running time: 100 minutes
- Language: English

After Alice (also known as Eye of The Killer) is a 2000 mystery thriller film directed by Paul Marcus and written by Jeff Miller. The film stars Kiefer Sutherland as Detective Mickey Hayden.

== Plot ==
A troubled cop makes a discovery that really has him worried in this thriller. Police detective Mickey Hayden (Kiefer Sutherland) is ordered to take a new look at a case he'd worked on ten years ago. A brilliant but demented serial killer known as Jabberwocky went on a killing spree before dropping out of sight. Hayden was never able to track him down and the disappointment has left him with more than his share of emotional scars, resulting in alcoholism. After a decade of silence, Jabberwocky strikes again, sending the police a note suggesting Hayden be put back on his case. But this time around, Hayden notices something different as he investigates the killings; when he comes in contact with the evidence, he has troubling psychic visions that tell him more about the murders than he ever wanted to know.

== Cast ==
- Kiefer Sutherland as Detective Mickey Hayden
- Henry Czerny as Harvey
- Polly Walker as Dr. Vera Swann
- Gary Hudson as John Hatter
- Ronn Sarosiak as Ray Coombs
- Stephen Ouimette as Gideon Wood
- Eve Crawford as Margaret Ellison
- Denis Akiyama as Owen Gackstetter
- Ardon Bess as Lenny
- A. Frank Ruffo as Alvin

== Reception ==
The film was originally produced for the cable network HBO and was released on DVD by Lionsgate on October 24, 2000. It received a mixed review from TV Guide, which criticized the pacing of the film and the reliance on cliches of the thriller genre but praised the suspenseful tone and performances of the actors.
