= Heartless (2005 film) =

2005 American television film

- DVD cover
- Also known as: Lethal Seduction
- Genre: Drama; Comedy
- Based on: articles by Howard Swindle
- Teleplay by: Adam Greenman
- Directed by: Robert Markowitz
- Starring: Melanie Griffith
- Theme music composer: Terence Blanchard
- Country of origin: United States
- Original language: English

Production
- Executive producers: Kimberly Calhoun Boling; Jack Grossbart; Malcolm Petal
- Production locations: Jefferson Parish, Louisiana; Kenner, Louisiana; New Orleans, Louisiana
- Cinematography: Thomas Del Ruth

Original release
- Release: May 5, 2005

Heartless (also known as Lethal Seduction) is a 2005 American film written by Howard Swindle and Adam Greenman, directed by Robert Markowitz. The film's running time is 90 minutes.

== Plot ==
Miranda Wells is an attorney with a sideline in immigration fraud and murder. Miranda's assistant, Carla, is unaware of her criminal activities. David Lopez, a journalist setting out to expose Miranda, poses as Rick Benes, an illegal immigrant, and takes a job in the office. Carla stumbles on incriminating files and David Lopez, in pursuit of the story, is threatened when he becomes infatuated with Miranda. Carla is attacked and her husband murdered, Miranda is the chief suspect. As the investigation progresses and Carla disappears from hospital, it is clear that Miranda will stop at nothing including murdering again to stay out.

== Cast ==
Actor	Role
Melanie Griffith	Miranda Wells
Lidia Porto	Carla Arujo
Gregg Henry	Lieutenant Russ Carter
David Jensen	Mitchel Harding
Ritchie Montgomery	Detective Steve Syler
Keith Flippen	District Attorney Lansing
Mike Franklin	Assistant District Attorney
Michael Arata	
Marcus Lyle Brown	ICU Doctor
Robb Conner	Nino
Anne Ewen	Eleonor
Lara Grice	Secretary
Mark Krasnoff	Ed Brunet
Earl Maddox	Hector
Esai Morales	Rick Benes / David Lopez
Derek Morgan	Detective Kantrow
Dane Rhodes	Prisoner
Ryan Rilette	Delivery Man
Stephen Rue	Heir
Veronica Russell	Reporter
Brandon Smith	Business executive
Michael Wozniak	Detective
