= Deception (2004 film) =

- Written by: Ed Silverstein
- Directed by: Richard Roy
- Starring: Dina Meyer; Steve Bacic; Gary Hudson; Anna Silk
- Countries of origin: Canada; United States
- Original language: English

Production
- Producer: Josée Mauffette
- Cinematography: Georges Archambault
- Editor: Arthur Tarnowski
- Running time: 88 minutes

Original release
- Release: March 6, 2004

Deception is a 2004 Canadian-American television film starring Dina Meyer.

== Plot ==
Erin, a struggling actress, has little faith in men. She works for a detective agency, her job is to seduce married men and let their wives catch them in the act. But lately, Erin has been getting threatening phone calls and someone is trying to hurt her.

== Cast ==
- Dina Meyer as Erin
- Steve Bacic as Max
- Gary Hudson as Jack
- Anna Silk as Julie
- Alan Fawcett as Barnes
- Frank Fontaine as Parker
- Rachelle Lefevre as Denise
- Jeff Roop as Chet
- Cary Lawrence as Dina
- Bill Rowat as Dale Williamson
- Russell Yuen as a Director
- Mark Camacho as Detective Costello
