= Gary Hudson (actor) =

American actor, producer and director (born 1956)

- Born: March 26, 1956 (age 70); Newport News, Virginia, United States
- Citizenship: American-Canadian (dual citizenship)
- Education: Christopher Newport College
- Occupation: Actor
- Years active: 1979–present

Gary Hudson (born March 26, 1956) is an American-Canadian actor.

== Early life ==
Hudson was born on March 26, 1956, in Newport News, Virginia, and raised in historic Hilton Village, where his father was also born. He left Virginia in 1977 after attending Christopher Newport College for two years to pursue his acting career in Los Angeles. His first acting job was in the film Hooper starring Burt Reynolds.

== Career ==
From there Hudson's career began, and has led to numerous work in films, TV shows, stage, producing and directing. His credits include series regular roles on Safe at Home, As the World Turns, Paradise Falls, in 1990 Santa Barbara as Blackie Simpson and the 2009 Canadian TV series Wild Roses in Calgary, Canada, where he was nominated for Best Actor at the Monte-Carlo Television Festival. He recurred on Smallville, Dynasty, The Adventures of Brisco County, Jr., The Tracey Ullman Show, Air America and L.A. Heat.

His guest appearances are numerous including Cold Case, ER, Missing, Mike Hammer, Doc, Too Close for Comfort, Mama's Family, Three's Company, Matt Houston, The Facts of Life and Hotel among others.

Hudson has starred in over 30 films and worked with numerous Oscar and Emmy winners. His films include the cult classic Road House with Patrick Swayze, Battle in Seattle with Charlize Theron and Woody Harrelson, After Alice with Kiefer Sutherland, She's Too Young with Marcia Gay Harden, All-American Girl: The Mary Kay Letourneau Story with Mercedes Ruehl and Penelope Ann Miller, Jasper, Texas with Jon Voight and Louis Gossett Jr., A Season on the Brink with Brian Dennehy, Love Thy Neighbor, Deception with Dina Meyer, Perfect Sport and Cheyenne among others.

== Personal life ==
For the last 14 years, Hudson has split up his time between the United States and Canada. He later became a Canadian citizen and spends time in the Great White North in the northern border of the United States.

Hudson has nine nieces and nephews.

== Filmography ==
=== Film ===
Year	Title	Role	Notes
1979	Skatetown, U.S.A.	Extra	
1981	King of the Mountain	Gang Leader	
1988	Cameron's Closet	Bob Froelich	
1989	Road House	Steve	
1990	Night Angel	Rod	
1993	Wild Cactus	Randall Murphy	
1993	Sexual Intent	John	Direct-to-video
1993	Indecent Behavior	Nick Sharkey	
1993	Martial Outlaw	Jack White	Direct-to-video
1993	Mind Twister	Daniel Strahten	
1994	Scanner Cop	Damon Pratt	Direct-to-video
1994	The Force	Des Flynn	Direct-to-video
1995	Texas Payback	Cody	
1995	Serial Killer	Cole Grayson	Direct-to-video
1995	The Wrong Woman	Lieutenant Nagel	
1996	Hungry for You	Cowboy	Uncredited
1996	Cheyenne	Jeremiah	
1998	Black Thunder	Jannick	
1999	Treasure of Pirate's Point	Al Brock / Hook	Direct-to-video
1999	Bridge of Dragons	Emmerich	
1999	Operation Delta Force 4: Deep Fault	Sparks	
2000	After Alice	John Hatter	
2000	Bless the Child	Maggie's Date	
2000	The Stepdaughter	Paris	Direct-to-video
2001	Extreme Limits	Captain Ed Lorenzo	
2002	The Circuit 2: The Final Punch	Baxter	Direct-to-video
2005	Two for the Money	Brandon's Dad	
2007	Battle in Seattle	Lieutenant	
2007	Resident Evil: Extinction	Umbrella Captain	Uncredited
2007	King of Sorrow	Anthony Franco	
2008	Perfect Sport	Joe Kross	
2008	A Line in the Sand	Monsignor	
2008	Necessary Evil	Sanders	
2009	The Least Among You	Attorney	
2010	Dancing Ninja	Garland Jones	
2011	Girl Walks into a Bar	Mr. Trombone	
2011	Deadline	Brills	
2012	The Nevsky Project	Ralph	
2013	Defending Santa	Robert Nielson	
2014	The Dependables	Captain Landers	
2014	Wings of the Dragon	Cody Blake	
2016	Chris Tasara: Chaos		Direct-to-video
2016	Dead Unanimity	Captain	Short film
2017	Sean's New Groove	Trout Conaway (voice)	Direct-to-video
2018	Fifty Shades Freed	Elena's Ex-Husband	
2019	Extracurricular Activities	Mr. Collins	
2023	One True Loves	Joe	

=== Television ===
Year	Title	Role	Notes
1980	Hart to Hart	Hairdresser #1	Episode: "Does She or Doesn't She?"
1982	Romance Theatre		5 episodes
1982	Three's Company	Jerry	Episode: "The Brunch"
1983	The Facts of Life	Chad Broxton	Episode: "Magnificent Obsession"
1983	The Fall Guy	Greg Cominsky	Episode: "Manhunter"
1983	Too Close for Comfort	Rick Patterson	Episode: "Don't Rock the Boat"
1983	Mama's Family	Glen	Episode: "Ellen's Boyfriend"
1983	Emerald Point N.A.S.	Tony	Episode: "#1.11"
1984	Matt Houston	Mick Gifford	Episode: "Deadly Games"
1985	The Colbys	Drunk Man	Episode: "The Celebration"
1986	Safe at Home	Roger Kyle	Unknown episodes
1987	The Tracey Ullman Show	David	Sketch: "David Meets the Folks"
1987	Dynasty	Skip Maitland	3 episodes
1988	Jake and the Fatman	Bradford Archer	Episode: "After You've Gone"
1988	Ladykillers	Michael Foster	Television movie
1988	The Tracey Ullman Show	Burke	Sketch: "To Masseur with Love"
1988	Hunter	Goetz	Episode: "Payback"
1989	Beauty and the Beast	Gus	Episode: "What Rough Beast"
1990	Matlock	Peter Southcott	Episode: "The Pro"
1990	Santa Barbara	'Blackie' Simpson	Episode: "#1.1450"
1991	Silk Stalkings	Dr. Marc Dennison	Episode: "Pilot"
1994	Empty Nest	Drake	Episode: "Gesundheit"
1994	Cries Unheard: The Donna Yaklich Story	Steve	Television movie
1994	The Adventures of Brisco County, Jr.	Sheriff Aaron Viva	3 episodes
1996	Touched by an Angel	Tom Pound	Episode: "The Sky Is Falling"
1996	Silk Stalkings	Artie Sayles	Episode: "Pre-Judgement Day"
1997	Walker, Texas Ranger	Frank Valen	Episode: "Full Contact"
1997	The Dukes of Hazzard: Reunion!	Riker	Television movie
1997	JAG		Episode: "Ghosts"
1998–1999	Air America	Henry Stanley	5 episodes
1998	Mike Hammer, Private Eye	Frank	Episode: "Dump the Creep"
1999	ER	Frank Putnam	Episode: "Rites of Spring"
1999	L.A. Heat	Bobby Cole	5 episodes
2000	All-American Girl: The Mary Kay Letourneau Story	Charles Dunphy	Television movie
2000	Twice in a Lifetime	Mr. Harmony	Episode: "The Night Before Christmas"
2001	The Familiar Stranger	Bill Sellers	Television movie
2001	Blue Murder	Dr. Shoenfeld	Episode: "Intensive Care"
2001	Paradise Falls	Brick Madison	15 episodes
2001	Dark Realm	Marty	Episodes: "Black Out: Parts 1 & 2"
2002	A Season on the Brink	Ron Felling	Television movie
2003	Doc	Tom Ryan	Episode: "Lost and Found"
2003	Mutant X	Warden Wallington	Episode: "Hard Time"
2003	Jasper, Texas	Defense Attorney 'Sonny' Cribbs	Television movie
2003	Behind the Camera: The Unauthorized Story of Three's Company	Tony Thomopolous	Television movie
2003	Playmakers		Episode: "Tenth of a Second"
2003	Tarzan	Detective Sands	Episode: "Surrender"
2004	Smallville	FBI Agent Frank Loder	4 episodes
2004	She's Too Young	Bill Vogul	Television movie
2004	Deception	Jack	Television movie
2005	Snakeman	Dr. John Simon	Television movie
2005	Missing	Dr. Aaron Flowers	Episode: "Last Night"
2005	A Lover's Revenge	Rob Manners	Television movie
2006	Love Thy Neighbor	Jim Benson	Television movie
2006	Murder in My House	Brian Ellis	Television movie
2007	Angels Fall	Rick Marsden	Television movie
2007	Termination Point	Martin	Television movie
2009	Wild Roses	David McGregor	13 episodes
2009	Cold Case	Jebediah Buford	Episode: "The Long Blue Line"
2010	Blue Mountain State	Greg James	Episode: "Pay for Play"
2011	Criminal Minds	Tim	Episode: "The Thirteenth Step"
2012	Desperate Housewives	Jerry	Episode: "Is This What You Call Love?"
2013	The Perfect Boss	Don Renfro	Television movie
2013	Drop Dead Diva	Walter Clark	Episode: "Back from the Dead"
2013	Missing at 17	Mike Foster	Television movie
2014	Officer Blue	Sergeant Duke Norton	11 episodes
2014	The Girl He Met Online	Dr. Harris Kohling	Television movie
2015	Suits	Richard McIntyre	Episode: "Derailed"
2015	Rizzoli & Isles	Jay Butler	Episode: "Bassholes"
2017	Blue Eyes	Attorney James Kimble	Television movie
2018	Taken	General Reed	Episode: "OPSEC"
2020	NCIS	Detective John Fioscher	Episode: "In a Nutshell"
2024	9-1-1: Lone Star	Randy	Episode: "Thunderstruck"

=== Video games ===
Year	Title	Role	Notes
1995	Solar Eclipse	Stuntman - Lieutenant Jake Cross	
2018	Red Dead Redemption 2	The Local Pedestrian Population	
2020	Fallout 76: Steel Dawn	George Putnam	
