= Project Blue Book (TV series) =

2019 American historical drama television series

- Genre: Historical period drama; Science fiction; Conspiracy
- Created by: David O'Leary
- Starring: Aidan Gillen; Michael Malarkey; Laura Mennell; Ksenia Solo; Michael Harney; Neal McDonough
- Composer: Daniel Wohl
- Country of origin: United States
- Original language: English
- No. of seasons: 2
- No. of episodes: 20

Production
- Executive producers: Robert Zemeckis; David O'Leary; Sean Jablonski
- Production location: Vancouver, British Columbia
- Running time: 42–44 minutes
- Production companies: Compari Entertainment; A&E Studios

Original release
- Network: History
- Release: January 8, 2019 – March 24, 2020

Project Blue Book is an American historical drama television series that premiered on History on January 8, 2019. The main role of Dr. J. Allen Hynek is played by Aidan Gillen, and the first season consisted of ten episodes. The series is based on the real-life Project Blue Book, a series of studies on unidentified flying objects conducted by the United States Air Force. On February 10, 2019, History renewed the series for a 10-episode second season which premiered on January 21, 2020. In May 2020, it was announced that the series had been canceled.

== Premise ==
The series revolves around the real-life Project Blue Book, a secret series of investigations into supposed UFO encounters and unexplained phenomena undertaken by the United States Air Force with skeptical astrophysics professor — and eventual ufologist — Dr. J. Allen Hynek in the 1950s and 1960s. With his partner, Air Force veteran Captain Michael Quinn, they investigate sightings across the U.S., and Dr. Hynek discovers that not everything can be explained by science.

== Cast and characters ==
=== Main ===
- Aidan Gillen as Dr. J. Allen Hynek, an astronomer, astrophysicist, professor, and UFOlogist working on Project Blue Book. Skeptical about the existence of alien life and UFOs in the beginning, Hynek attempts to explain the cases using his analytical and scientific mind.
- Michael Malarkey as Captain Michael Quinn, a decorated veteran who served with the United States Army Air Force as a pilot during World War II, and working with Dr. Hynek on Project Blue Book. The character is inspired by USAF Captain Edward J. Ruppelt, the first director of the real-life Project Blue Book.
- Laura Mennell as Mimi Hynek, Allen Hynek's wife.
- Ksenia Solo as Susie Miller, a friend and neighbour of Mimi Hynek, also a KGB agent.
- Michael Harney as General Hugh Valentine, a high-ranking military official, and founder of Project Blue Book. The character is inspired by USAF Major General Charles P. Cabell, the founder of the real-life Project Blue Book.
- Neal McDonough as General James Harding, a high-ranking military official and a co-founder of Project Blue Book. The character is inspired by USAF Brigadier General William Garland, a member of General Charles P. Cabell staff during the time period of the real-life Project Blue Book.

=== Recurring ===
- Robert John Burke as William Fairchild, United States Secretary of Defense.
- Ian Tracey as "The Fixer" a.k.a. "The Man in the Hat" (later revealed to be one of the Men In Black), a mysterious man who follows Dr. Hynek. The character is partly inspired by Ingo Swann, allegedly involved in the Stargate Project.
- Matt O'Leary as Lieutenant Henry Fuller, a USAF pilot whom Hynek and Quinn meet on their first case.
- Nicholas Holmes as Joel Hynek, Mimi and Allen's son.
- Currie Graham as Susie’s Associate, also a KGB agent.
- Jill Morrison as Faye, a member of the Air Force and Captain Quinn's secretary at Wright Patterson Air Force Base.
- Michael Imperioli as Edward Rizzuto, an American/Russian double agent.

=== Historical figures ===
- Adam Greydon Reid as Donald Keyhoe (spelled in the credits as "Kehoe"), an American writer and UFO researcher. Keyhoe was widely regarded as the leader in the field of UFOlogy in the 1950s and early to mid-1960s, appearing in the episode entitled "The Lubbock Lights".
- Thomas Kretschmann as Wernher von Braun, a German-American aerospace engineer. Von Braun was the leading figure in the development of rocket technology in Nazi Germany, before coming to the U.S. to develop rockets for NASA, appearing in "Operation Paperclip".
- Bob Gunton as President Harry S. Truman, 33rd President of the United States, appearing in "The Washington Merry-Go Round".
- Caspar Phillipson as Senator John F. Kennedy, appearing in Season 2. Phillipson reprises his role from the 2016 biographical drama film Jackie and its 2017 spin-off short film The Speech JFK Never Gave, later reprising the role again in the 2022 biographical fiction film Blonde, in which he had portrayed an older Kennedy as the President of the United States.

== Episodes ==
Season	Episodes	Originally released	
Season	Episodes	First released	Last released
1	10	January 8, 2019	March 12, 2019
2	10	January 21, 2020	March 24, 2020

=== Season 1 (2019) ===
No. overall	No. in season	Title	Directed by	Written by	Original release date	U.S. viewers (millions)
1	1	"The Fuller Dogfight"	Robert Stromberg	David O'Leary	January 8, 2019	2.27
In 1952, Dr J. Allen Hynek joins Project Blue Book, an investigation into UFOs conducted by the US Air Force, working with Captain Michael Quinn to investigate what happened after a pilot, Henry Fuller, claims to have gotten into a dogfight with an alien craft in Fargo. The two travel to Fargo to talk to Fuller and to look at Fuller's plane. Meanwhile, Allen's wife, Mimi, makes a new friend while out shopping, Susie Miller. The two initially conclude that Fuller saw a weather balloon, though Hynek begins to doubt the veracity of this solution. Quinn takes Hynek up to prove him wrong and to recreate Fuller's flight, which ends in the two of them crashing in a field, where Hynek sees a mysterious figure who disappears. Hynek has a troubling conversation with Fuller in the hospital. Later, while heading home, he's followed by a mysterious black car, which he then follows to an abandoned fairground, which appears to be hiding some sort of secret facility. Susie appears to be following the Hyneks, while Fuller is forcibly taken from the hospital. The UFO encounter is loosely based on the Gorman dogfight incident.
2	2	"The Flatwoods Monster"	Robert Stromberg	Sean Jablonski	January 15, 2019	1.88
Dr. Hynek and Captain Quinn investigate a West Virginia case of a woman and her two children who witnessed a flying saucer crash near their farm and an alien being emerge from the fiery wreck. Based on the Flatwoods Monster case.
3	3	"The Lubbock Lights"	Pete Travis	Harley Peyton	January 22, 2019	1.95
When the citizens of Lubbock, Texas witness a mysterious V-shaped craft in the night sky, Hynek and Quinn are brought in to investigate the mass sighting. The mass sighting is loosely based on the Lubbock Lights incident.
4	4	"Operation Paperclip"	Pete Travis	David O'Leary & Thania St. John	January 29, 2019	1.71
A bizarre UFO encounter with a commercial airliner leads Hynek and Quinn to a top-secret program involving ex-Nazi scientists in Huntsville, Alabama, known as Operation Paperclip, which has a mysterious agenda all its own. The initial encounter between a UFO and a passenger plane is loosely based on the Chiles-Whitted UFO case.
5	5	"Foo Fighters"	Norma Bailey	David O'Leary & Emily Brochin	February 5, 2019	1.39
Hynek and Quinn follow a series of strange clues leading them to a secret group who not only claim to have witnessed strange lights during combat called foo fighters, but also claim to know a way to contact them. See also: Marfa lights.
6	6	"The Green Fireballs"	Norma Bailey	Harley Peyton	February 12, 2019	1.66
After mysterious green fireballs nearly cause nuclear disaster during a weapons test, Hynek and Quinn must investigate how this could have occurred. Loosely based on the Green fireballs spotted around nuclear military installations and Project Twinkle designed to track and explain them.
7	7	"The Scoutmaster"	Thomas Carter	Aaron Rapke & Stewart Kaye	February 19, 2019	1.31
After a Scoutmaster vanishes when he and his troop witness a strange craft hovering in the woods, Hynek is sent to investigate for Project Blue Book, while Quinn is pulled into a rogue mission for General Harding. Inspired by the Sonny DesVergers Scoutmaster UFO case.
8	8	"War Games"	Thomas Carter	Thania St. John	February 26, 2019	1.45
When a film emerges documenting an Army platoon getting under UFO attack during a routine exercise, the Generals send Hynek and Quinn in to investigate, where they find the soldiers not only suffer from physical effects of war, but psychological ones as well. Based on US Army UFO incidents during the Korean War.
9	9	"Abduction"	Alex Graves	Sean Jablonski	March 5, 2019	1.51
A man suffering debilitating after-effects of a supposed alien abduction is holding Hynek and Quinn at gunpoint, demanding they investigate the case, leading Hynek to resort to regressive hypnosis. The UFO encounter is inspired by the Betty and Barney Hill UFO experience.
10	10	"The Washington Merry-Go Round"	Alex Graves	David O'Leary	March 12, 2019	1.55
The nation's capital is thrown into a panic when Washington D.C. is swarmed by UFOs, and now the highest echelons of power task Hynek and Quinn with uncovering the true nature of the threat.

=== Season 2 (2020) ===
No. overall	No. in season	Title	Directed by	Written by	Original release date	U.S. viewers (millions)
11	1	"The Roswell Incident - Part I"	Deran Sarafian	David O'Leary	January 21, 2020	1.43
Hynek and Quinn follow Gen. Harding to Roswell, New Mexico, where an anonymous individual has threatened to expose evidence to the world of an extra-terrestrial crash landing six years ago. Loosely inspired by the Roswell UFO incident.
12	2	"The Roswell Incident - Part II"	Deran Sarafian	Sean Jablonski	January 28, 2020	1.34
Hynek and Quinn close in on a culprit, and finally learn the truth about what happened in Roswell. Loosely inspired by the Roswell UFO incident and the alien autopsy video.
13	3	"Area 51"	Pete Travis	Alec Wells	February 4, 2020	1.13
When a soldier is seemingly abducted by a flying saucer at a military base in the remote Nevada desert, Hynek and Quinn take up the case. But they will soon learn that there are many reasons for the dangerous Area 51 to want to keep its secrets. Based on the abduction and death of Jonathan Lovette.
14	4	"Hopkinsville"	Pete Travis	Harley Peyton	February 11, 2020	1.40
When alleged alien beings invade a home in rural Kentucky, Hynek and Quinn are brought in on the CIA's top-secret program, MK Ultra, which believes the attack may be the start of a much larger invasion. Inspired by the Kelly-Hopkinsville encounter and referencing the Pentacle Memorandum.
15	5	"The Men in Black"	Wendey Stanzler	Emily Brochin	February 18, 2020	1.09
When Hynek is kidnapped by the mysterious Man in Black, Quinn teams up with the CIA to track him down and save his life. References the Maury Island incident.
16	6	"Close Encounters"	Wendey Stanzler	Linda Burstyn	February 25, 2020	1.19
While reminiscing on the set of Close Encounters of the Third Kind, Hynek recounts his experiences with the infamous Robertson Panel and the eccentric alien contactee for whom he put everything on the line. The character of the contactee David Dubrovsky is loosely based on George Adamski.
17	7	"Curse of the Skinwalker"	Norma Bailey	Harley Peyton	March 3, 2020	1.36
Hynek and Quinn head to a Utah ranch to investigate a young family's claims of unexplainable and dangerous phenomena.
18	8	"What Lies Beneath"	John Scott	Alec Wells	March 10, 2020	1.32
When sensitive material is stolen from Generals Harding and Valentine, Hynek and Quinn will realise that not only does their culprit lie far closer to home than they could imagine, but so does undeniable evidence of a UFO conspiracy. Referencing Hangar 18 at Wright-Patterson Air Force Base.
19	9	"Broken Arrow"	Norma Bailey	Linda Burstyn	March 17, 2020	1.34
When Hynek and Quinn track down a mysterious plane that has vanished in the Canadian wilderness, they embark on a dangerous mission to recover its missing cargo that threatens not just Project Blue Book, but the whole world. The loss of a military plane after an apparent collision with a UFO in Canadian airspace is loosely based on the Kinross Incident.
20	10	"Operation Mainbrace"	Loni Peristere	David O'Leary	March 24, 2020	1.42
When UFOs and USOs (unidentified submersible objects) begin plaguing a massive naval exercise on the border of Russian waters, Hynek and Quinn realise it's up to them to stop a rogue Admiral from starting WWIII.

== Production ==
The series was filmed in Vancouver, British Columbia, Canada. It was co-produced by the History Channel and A&E Studios. Filming on the second season began on July 15, 2019, and was expected to conclude on November 13, 2019.

== Reception ==
=== Critical reception ===
On the review aggregator website Rotten Tomatoes, the series has an approval rating of 65% based on 17 reviews, with an average rating of 6.65/10. The website's critical consensus reads, "Project Blue Book will likely intrigue fans of the paranormal with its loose adaptation of historically unexplained phenomena, but this buttoned-down series lacks the narrative verve to appeal beyond the true believers." Metacritic, which uses a weighted average, assigned a score of 56 out of 100 based on 10 critics, indicating "mixed or average reviews".

Paranormal investigator and skeptic Robert Sheaffer, reviewing the first four episodes, argued there are historical inaccuracies which extend beyond the claim of being based on real events.

=== Ratings ===
==== Season 1 ====
Viewership and ratings per episode of Project Blue Book
No.	Title	Air date	Rating (18–49)	Viewers (millions)	DVR (18–49)	DVR viewers (millions)	Total (18–49)	Total viewers (millions)
1	"The Fuller Dogfight"	January 8, 2019	0.4	2.27	0.4	1.61	0.8	3.88
2	"The Flatwoods Monster"	January 15, 2019	0.3	1.88	0.4	1.82	0.7	3.70
3	"The Lubbock Lights"	January 22, 2019	0.4	1.95	0.4	1.85	0.8	3.79
4	"Operation Paperclip"	January 29, 2019	0.3	1.71	0.4	1.77	0.7	3.48
5	"Foo Fighters"	February 5, 2019	0.3	1.39	—N/a	—N/a	—N/a	—N/a
6	"The Green Fireballs"	February 12, 2019	0.3	1.66	0.4	1.55	0.7	3.21
7	"The Scoutmaster"	February 19, 2019	0.3	1.31	0.3	1.54	0.6	2.84
8	"War Games"	February 26, 2019	0.3	1.45	0.3	1.39	0.6	2.84
9	"Abduction"	March 5, 2019	0.3	1.51	0.3	1.27	0.6	2.78
10	"The Washington Merry-Go Round"	March 12, 2019	0.3	1.55	0.3	1.32	0.6	2.87

==== Season 2 ====
Viewership and ratings per episode of Project Blue Book
No.	Title	Air date	Rating (18–49)	Viewers (millions)	DVR (18–49)	DVR viewers (millions)	Total (18–49)	Total viewers (millions)
1	"The Roswell Incident - Part I"	January 21, 2020	0.3	1.43	—N/a	1.31	—N/a	2.74
2	"The Roswell Incident - Part II"	January 28, 2020	0.2	1.34	—N/a	1.18	—N/a	2.53
3	"Area 51"	February 4, 2020	0.2	1.13	—N/a	1.20	—N/a	2.33
4	"Hopkinsville"	February 11, 2020	0.3	1.40	—N/a	—N/a	—N/a	—N/a
5	"The Men in Black"	February 18, 2020	0.2	1.09	—N/a	—N/a	—N/a	—N/a
6	"Close Encounters"	February 25, 2020	0.2	1.19	—N/a	1.19	—N/a	2.38
7	"Curse of the Skinwalker"	March 3, 2020	0.2	1.36	—N/a	1.11	—N/a	2.47
8	"What Lies Beneath"	March 10, 2020	0.2	1.32	—N/a	—N/a	—N/a	—N/a
9	"Broken Arrow"	March 17, 2020	0.2	1.34	—N/a	1.08	—N/a	2.42
10	"Operation Mainbrace"	March 24, 2020	0.2	1.42	—N/a	1.09	—N/a	2.51
