= Ksenia Solo =

Latvian-Canadian actress (born 1987)

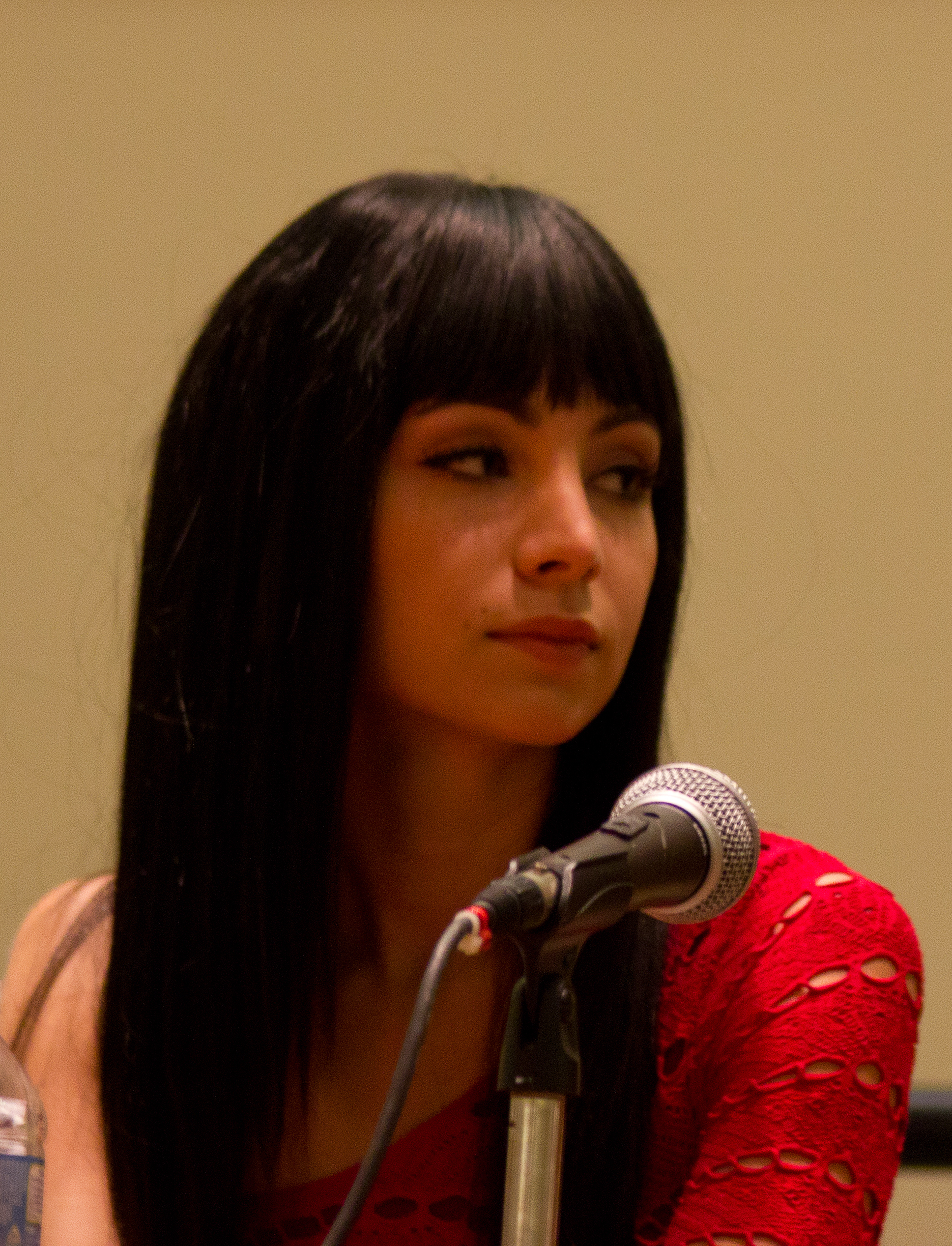
- Solo in 2011
- Born: 8 October 1987 (age 38); Riga, Latvian SSR, Soviet Union
- Occupation: Actress
- Years active: 2000–present

Ksenia Solo (born 8 October 1987; pronounced /kəˈsɛnjə ˈsoʊloʊ/) is a Latvian-Canadian actress known for portraying Mackenzie "Kenzi" Malikov on Lost Girl. She portrayed Peggy Shippen on Turn: Washington's Spies. Solo also portrayed the character "Natasha" in the 2010 American television series Life Unexpected and Shay Davydov in Season 3 of Orphan Black.

As of 2024, her most recent work was in the main cast for the two seasons of the series Project Blue Book (2019–20).

== Early life ==
Solo was born in Riga and is of Russian heritage. At the age of five, she moved with her family to Toronto, where she was raised. She studied ballet until the age of 14, when a back injury forced her to stop; her mother is a former ballerina-turned-actress.

== Career ==
Solo played Zoey Jones on the APTN series renegadepress.com. In both 2005 and 2006, she won the Gemini Award for Best Performance in a Children's or Youth Program or Series for her work on the show. She went on to appear in other Canadian television series and movies, such as the films Love Thy Neighbor and Mayday, as well as guest-starring on the television series Kojak.

In 2010, Solo played a small role in Darren Aronofsky's Black Swan starring Natalie Portman and Mila Kunis. From 2010 to 2011 she played Natasha Siviac in the CW series Life Unexpected. From 2010 to 2015, she starred as Kenzi in the Showcase series Lost Girl; Solo's heritage and fluency in the Russian language were written into the role. She was cast as Dodge in the pilot episode of Locke & Key, but the series was not picked up by Fox. In 2013, Solo began filming the independent film Another You on location in Charleston, West Virginia.

In 2015, Solo joined the main cast of Turn: Washington's Spies as Peggy Shippen. She also had a recurring role in Season 3 of Orphan Black as Shay.

Solo is actively involved with the anti-bullying foundation Stand for the Silent, and was made one of their directors.

== Filmography ==
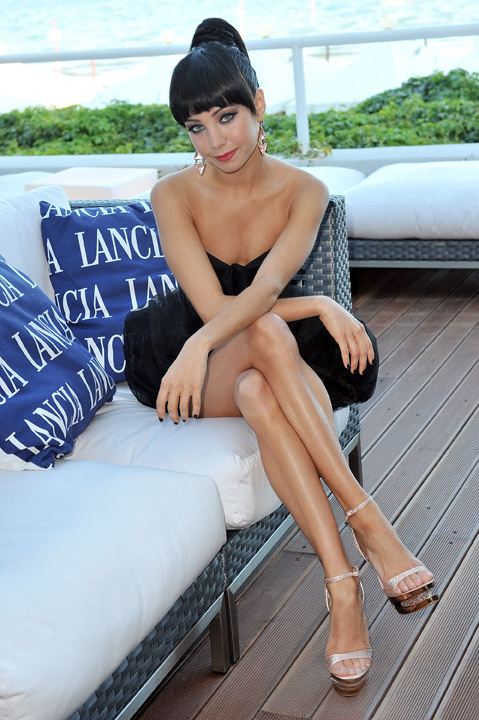
Solo in 2010

=== Film ===
Year	Title	Role	Notes
2001	A Man of Substance	Hannah	Short film
2001	My Louisiana Sky	Abby Lynn Anders	
2001	What Girls Learn	Girl	
2002	Sins of the Father	Lucinda	
2003	The Republic of Love	Micheline	
2003	Defending Our Kids: The Julie Posey Story	Kristyn Posey	
2006	Love Thy Neighbor	Erin Benson	
2010	Black Swan	Veronica	
2011	The Factory	Emma	
2016	Pet	Holly Garling	
2017	Another You	Sydney Jameson	
2017	In Search of Fellini	Lucy	
2017	Tulipani, Love, Honour and a Bicycle	Anna	

=== Television ===
Year	Title	Role	Notes
2000	I Was a Sixth Grade Alien	Xhanthippe	Episode: "Bride of Pleskit!"
2000	Earth: Final Conflict	Kathy Simmons	Episode: "Take No Prisoners"
2002	Adventure Inc.	Natalie	Episode: "Village of the Lost"
2004	Missing	Megan Hahn	Episode: "Judgement Day"
2004–08	renegadepress.com	Zoey Jones	Main role (Seasons 1–5); 52 episodes Won – Gemini Award for Best Performance in a Children's or Youth Program or Series (2005); Won – Gemini Award for Best Performance in a Children's or Youth Program or Series (2006)
2005	Kojak	Angela Howard	Episode: "All Bets Off: Part 1"
2007	Cold Case	Lena	Episode: "Cargo"
2008	Moonlight	Bonnie Morrow	Episode: "Fated to Pretend"
2009	Crime Stories	Waitress	Episode: "The Happy Face Killer"
2009	The Cleaner	Callie Bell	Episode: "Cinderella"
2010–11	Life Unexpected	Natasha Siviac	Main role (Seasons 1–2); 13 episodes
2010–15	Lost Girl	Mackenzie "Kenzi" Malikov	Main role (Seasons 1–5); 67 episodes Won – Gemini Award for Best Performance by an Actress in a Featured Supporting Role in a Dramatic Series (2011); Nominated – Canadian Screen Award for Best Performance by an Actress in a Featured Supporting Role in a Dramatic Program or Series (2013)
2011	Nikita	Irina	Episode: "Alexandra"
2011	Locke & Key	Dodge	Unsold Fox pilot
2012	Lost Girl Finale Pre-Show	as self	Showcase TV special
2013	Lost Girl ConFAEdential	as self	Showcase TV special
2013	UPYURS6	Kenzi	Lost Girl webisode
2013	Lost Girl: An Evening at the Clubhouse	as self	Showcase TV special
2015–17	Turn: Washington's Spies	Peggy Shippen	Main role (Seasons 2–4); 20 episodes
2015	Orphan Black	Shay Davydov	Recurring role (Season 3); 6 episodes
2018	The Simpsons	Anastasia Alekova (voice)	Episode: "From Russia Without Love"
2019–20	Project Blue Book	Susie Miller	Main role (Seasons 1–2); 20 episodes
