= Bo (Lost Girl) =

- Lost Girl character
- First appearance: “It’s a Fae, Fae World” (2010)
- Last appearance: “Rise” (2015)
- Created by: Michelle Lovretta
- Portrayed by: Anna Silk

In-universe information
- Full name: Ysabeau "Bo" Dennis
- Aliases: Bo Jones; Beth Dennis
- Species: Succubus
- Gender: Female
- Occupation: Private Investigator
- Affiliation: Unaligned
- Significant others: Lauren Lewis; Dyson (formerly); Rainer (formerly)
- Relatives: Aife (mother); Hades (father); Dagny (half-sister); Isabeau (grandmother); Fitzpatrick 'Trick' McCorrigan (grandfather); Mary Dennis (adoptive mother); Sam Dennis (adoptive father); Zee (aunt) [aka Zeus]; Heratio (uncle) [aka Hera]; Iris (cousin)
- Nationality: Born in Tartarus / Hel

Bo (nickname for birth name "Ysabeau") is the protagonist of Lost Girl, the Canadian supernatural drama television series that premiered on Showcase on September 12, 2010, and ran for five seasons. Bo (aka Bo Dennis, surname of adoptive name "Beth Dennis", and Bo Jones, false ID name) is a superhuman bisexual succubus. The character is portrayed by Anna Silk.

In the first episode of the series, It's a Fae, Fae, Fae, Fae World, Bo saved a young human woman named Kenzi from a rapist, and despite their differences the two quickly became friends. Confronted by the local Fae leaders with having to pick a clan, either "Light" or "Dark", Bo declared herself neutral, choosing to side with humans after Kenzi risked her life to find out where Bo had been forcefully taken and then helped Bo break free from a trance by calling out to her. Throughout the first season, Bo learns more about the Fae world and her supernatural nature, while searching for information about her origins. Along the way, Bo also develops romantic relationships with both Dyson, a Light Fae wolf-shapeshifter and police detective in the human police force; and Lauren, a human doctor and scientist in servitude to the Light Fae.

In 2012, "Bo" was No. 35 in the AfterEllen list of Top 50 Favorite Female TV Characters; and in 2013, No. 10 in its Top 65 Kick-Ass Female Fantasy Characters. In 2014, "Bo Dennis" was named No. 92 in the British Film Institute list of the top 100 Best Sci-Fi Characters of All Time.

== Fictography ==
=== Childhood and early years ===
Bo is a succubus who grew up in an adopted human family, unaware of her non-human nature and of the Fae world she descended from. In "Raging Fae", she told Kenzi that she began to feel "different" when she entered puberty and didn't know she was not normal until she accidentally killed her high school boyfriend by draining his life energy during her first sexual activity. When she told her parents what had happened, they broke the news to Bo that she had been adopted. Not knowing what she was and what she had done, Bo hated herself and ran away from home, exchanging her previous life for one without family or friends, moving from place to place and assuming a false identity whenever she killed again.

=== Powers ===
As a succubus, she can seduce and manipulate both humans and Fae with the touch of her skin; and has the power to absorb the life force (the "chi", or Qi) of humans and Fae by drawing it out through their mouths. She feeds and heals from oral chi intake, and chi absorbed from the sexual energy created with males or females. At first she could not feed without killing her sexual partners; but with Lauren's help Bo learned to control her sexual drive and chi-drawing powers so that she could have sex with both Fae and humans without injuring or killing them. Although Fae are stronger than humans and can better endure her feeding on them, they are not immune from being drained. Without self-control Bo can render them comatose or dead. In "(Dis)Members Only", Dyson's chi is drained by Bo's succubus birth mother, Aife, and Bo brings him back to life by transferring some of her own life energy into him.

== Relationships ==
=== The Love Triangle ===
The relationship between Bo and Dyson/Bo and Lauren is known as "The Love Triangle". Initially, there was rivalry between Dyson and Lauren over Bo, as neither one wanted her to be with the other, but they tolerated it. As the series progressed, Dyson and Lauren began to understand each other and the role they played in Bo's life, with the animosity that used to exist between them fading in favor of helping and protecting Bo. What Bo meant to them and they to her was tested throughout the series, with the relationship between Dyson and Bo evolving into an unequivocal friendship, while Lauren and Bo remained in love through hurdles and episodic distance.

=== The Second Love Triangle ===
When Bo and Lauren separated, Bo entered into a relationship with Tamsin, but soon after, Bo falls in love with Lauren again and they have sex. Tamsin discovers them and understands that Bo had never forgotten Lauren. At the end of the series, Lauren helps Tamsin give birth to her daughter Dagny. Tamsin thanks Bo and Lauren, the three reconcile, and she entrusts them with Dagny before her death.

== See also ==
- List of Lost Girl characters
