= Anna Silk =

Canadian actress

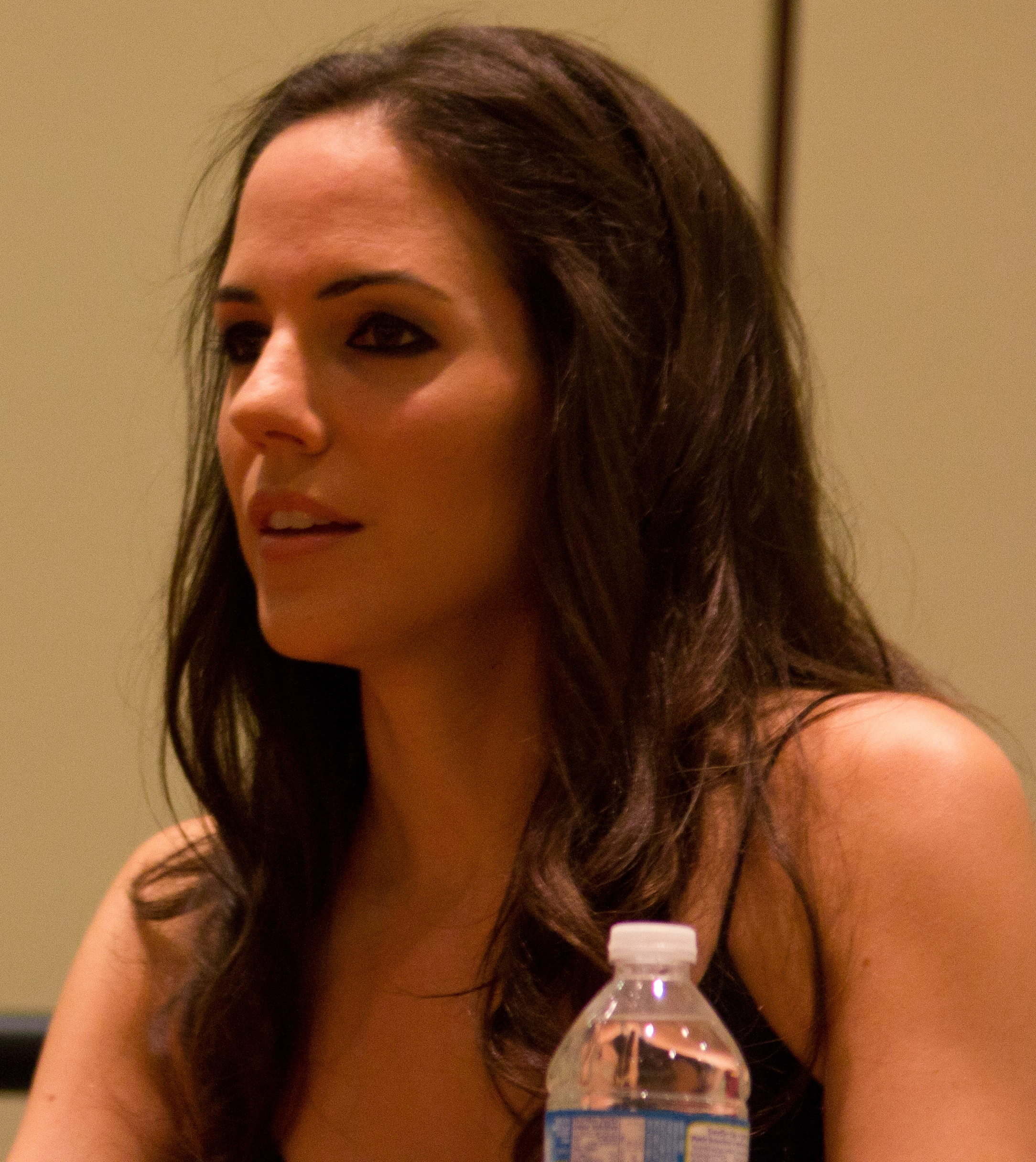
- Silk in August 2011
- Born: January 31, 1974 (age 52); Fredericton, New Brunswick, Canada
- Education: St. Thomas University
- Occupation: Actor
- Years active: 1999–present
- Known for: Bo on Lost Girl
- Spouse: Seth Cooperman (m. 2009)
- Children: 2

Anna Silk (born 31 January 1974) is a Canadian actress best known for her role as Bo Dennis, the protagonist of the Showcase television series Lost Girl (2010–2015). (Note: Anna Silk gained recognition throughout Canada for her performance as Deb, an overstressed flight attendant trying to quit smoking in popular NicoDerm television commercials.)

== Personal life ==
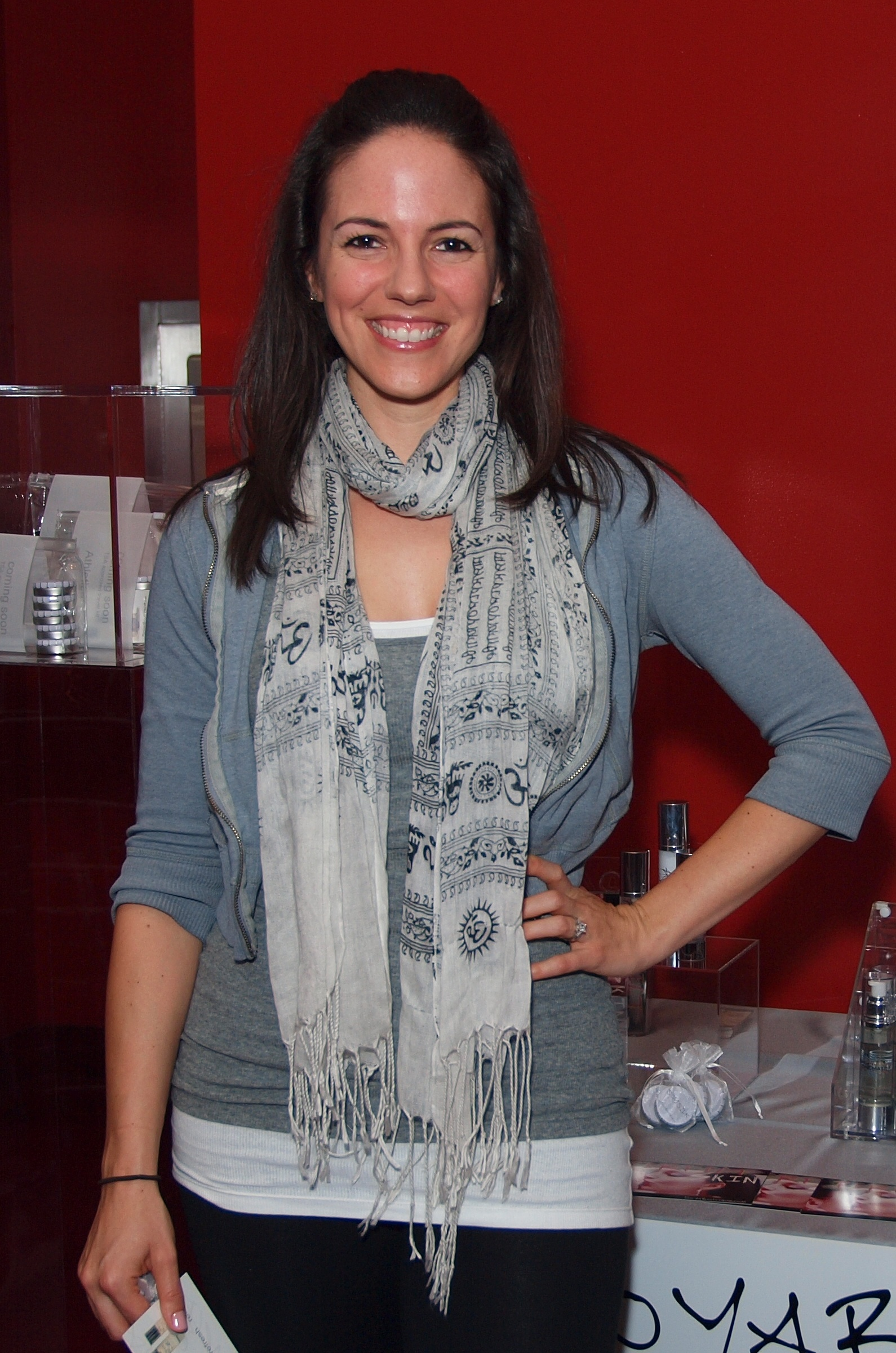
Silk at the 2010 Gemini Awards.

Silk was born in Fredericton, New Brunswick, Canada, the daughter of Peter Silk, an academic, and Ilkay Silk, an actress, director, producer, playwright, educator, and Director of Drama at St. Thomas University. Her father is British and her mother a "Turkish Cypriot-English expat". Some of Anna's earliest memories were of going to play rehearsals and watching her mother work. Silk appeared in several commercials as a child. She graduated from St. Thomas University with a Bachelor of Arts degree in 1997. Early theater work includes at least two productions with Theatre St. Thomas: Seven Menus and The Kitchen.

In November 1999, she moved to Toronto to further her acting career and during the following decade relocated to Los Angeles, California. She met Seth Cooperman in 2007 at an actor's workshop in Los Angeles; they became engaged in 2009, and married in a civil ceremony in December of the same year. On April 10, 2011, they renewed their vows in a Jewish ceremony in Fredericton after she converted to Judaism.

During a Showcase Lost Girl pre-show special on January 6, 2013, Silk announced that she was pregnant. On June 20, 2013, she announced via Twitter that she was ready to return to work on the series.

Silk gave birth to a son, Samuel Jerome Cooperman, in May 2013. Her second son, Levi Aaron Cooperman, was born on May 13, 2016.

== Career ==
Silk's television work includes the role of Cassidy Holland in Being Erica, for which she received a Gemini Awards nomination in 2009.

In 2009, she landed the principal role of Bo Dennis, a succubus, in the Canadian television series Lost Girl. The same-sex-lover pair of Bo (Silk's character) and Lauren (played by co-star Zoie Palmer) was included in news network CNN's list of all-time Favorite TV Couples; and declared Top TV Couple of 2013 by E! Entertainment Television. As a result of the show's popularity, Silk garnered a prominent online following on social media.

Silk appeared in the recurring role of Roarke, a mercenary, in the 2019 series Blood & Treasure.

== Filmography ==
=== Film ===
Year	Title	Role	Notes
2001	Camels of Nahor	Hadasa Green	Short film
2002	Confessions of a Dangerous Mind	Headset Woman	(uncredited)
2005	Where the Truth Lies	Gina	(uncredited)
2007	Do Not Bend	Catye	Short film
2007	Breakfast with Scot	Mia	
2013	Assassins Tale	Grace	
2018	Unspeakable		Short film; associate producer

=== Television ===
Year	Title	Role	Notes
1999	Daring & Grace: Teen Detectives	Sabrina	Episode: "1.112"
2002	Undressed	Becca	Episode: "6.17"
2003	Petits mythes urbains	Wife	Episode: "Sexes en eaux troubles"
2003	Mutant X	Asia	Episode: "Within These Walls"
2003	Missing	Marilyn Janáček	Episode: "Victoria"
2004	Dead Lawyers	Sonia Alexandropova	TV movie
2004	Puppets Who Kill	Sperm Bank Nurse	Episode: "Portrait of Buttons"
2004	Love Rules	Lynn Hopp	TV movie
2004	Deception	Julie	Video
2004	Anonymous Rex	Keri	TV movie
2005	Hate	Woman	TV movie
2005	The Perfect Neighbor	Ashley Marin	TV movie
2006	Earthstorm	Bryna	TV movie
2006	Angela's Eyes	Sondra	Episode: "The Camera's Eye"
2006	Legacy of Fear	Kathleen Coyne	TV movie
2007	The Jane Show	Kathy	Episode: "Shower Killer"
2007	'Til Death Do Us Part	Mindy Lohman	Episode: "Storage Unit Murder"
2007	The Company	Stella Bledsoe	TV miniseries
2007	Voicemail	Sandy	TV series short
2008	Ghost Whisperer	Haylie Wayne	Episode: "Big Chills"
2008	Billable Hours	Suzie	Episode: "Pigeon Lawyer"
2009–2010	Being Erica	Cassidy Holland	Episodes: "Everything She Wants", "The Importance of Being Erica", "Bear Breasts"
2010–2015	Lost Girl	Bo Dennis	Protagonist
2011	Republic of Doyle	Tania St. Croix	Episode: "St. John's Town"
2012	Lost Girl Finale Pre-Show	as self	Showcase TV special
2012	Top Chef Canada	as self	Season 2, episode 8: "Lights, Camera, Action!"
2013	Lost Girl ConFAEdential	as self	Showcase TV special
2013	Lost Girl: An Evening at the Clubhouse	as self	Showcase TV special
2018	Wynonna Earp	Kevin	Season 3, episode 10: "The Other Woman"
2019	Blood & Treasure	Roarke	Recurring role, 3 episodes

== Awards and nominations ==
Year	Award	Category	Film/Television	Result	Ref
2009	Gemini Awards	Best Performance by an Actress in a Guest Role, Dramatic Series	Being Erica ("Everything She Wants")	Nominated	
2015	Canadian Screen Awards	Fan's Choice Award	Lost Girl	Won	
2015	Golden Maple Awards	Best Actress in a TV Series Broadcasted in the US	Lost Girl	Nominated	
