= Mezipatra =

LGBTQ film festival in Czech Republic

Coordinates: 50°04′55″N 14°25′31″E

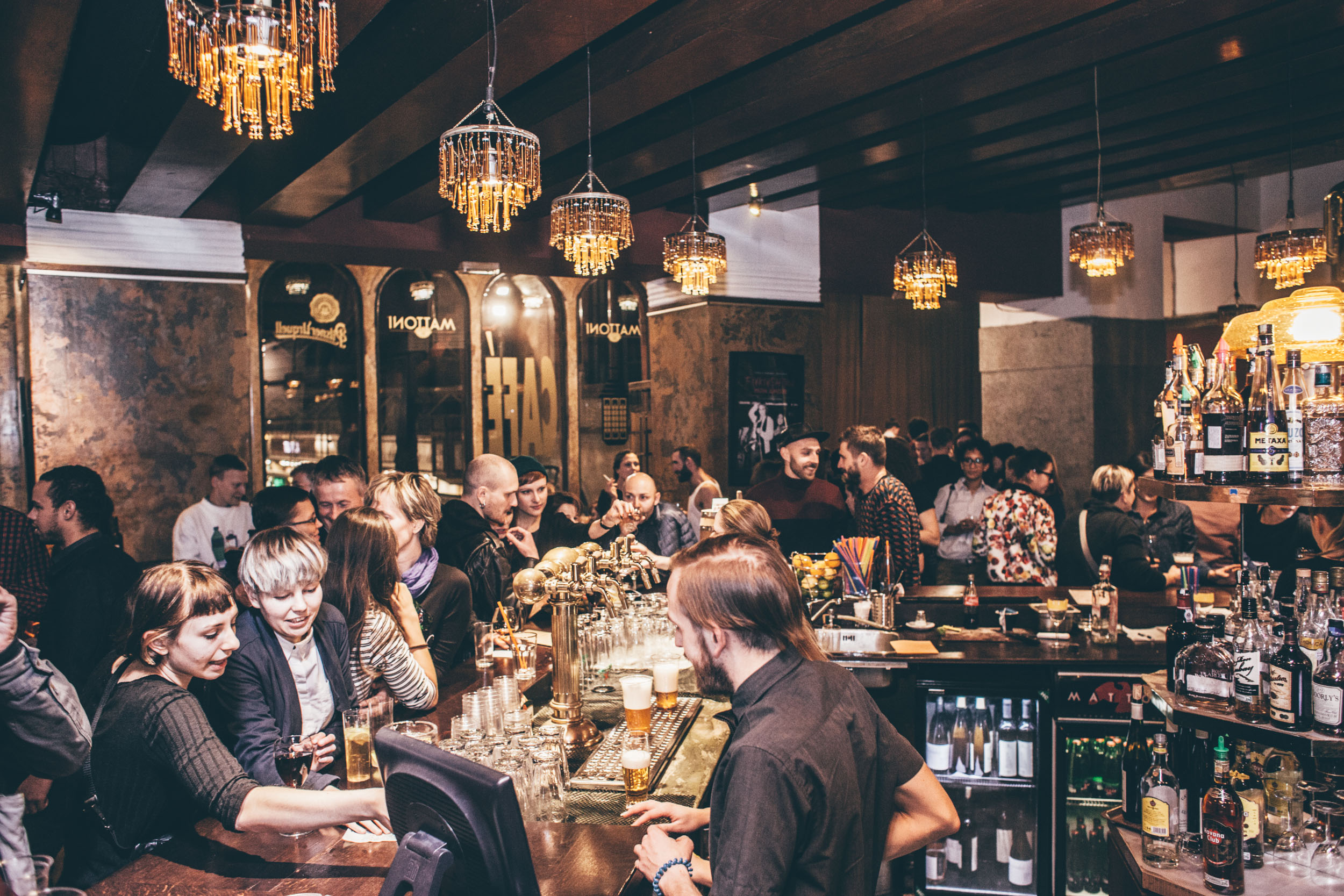
Opening ceremony of the 17th QFF Mezipatra

Mezipatra is a Czech queer film festival screening films with gay, lesbian, bisexual and transgender themes. The name Mezipatra translates as "mezzanine" and refers to the festival's mission: creating space for meeting of people regardless of their gender or sexual identities. Each edition explores a chosen theme and hosts a variety of international guests. The accompanying events range from lectures and debates to art openings, theatre performances as well as exciting parties. It takes place annually in November in Prague and Brno with related events in Ostrava, Olomouc and other cities in Czech Republic. Throughout the year Mezipatra offers additional screenings within the Mezipatra Approved edition. Mezipatra also participates in Prague Pride festival by organizing screenings and debates with LGBT themes.

== History ==
The festival was founded in Brno in 2000 as an accompanying program of the Gay Men CZ competition. The following year was already organized as a separate event – a film show called Duha nad Brnem (Rainbow over Brno). In 2002 the festival started using the name Mezipatra with the subtitle czech gay and lesbian film festival. In the same year, the festival expanded to Prague and in subsequent years to other cities of the Czech Republic and Slovakia. Since 2009, the festival has used the new subtitle queer film festival. Mezipatra was founded by a civic association called STUD Brno. Since 2013 it is organized by a registered association Mezipatra, STUD is a co-organizer under the license agreement.

== Winners ==
As of the 4th edition, Mezipatra introduced jury awards. The winners have been:

Main Jury Award for Best Feature Film

- 2021: Jumbo, Zoé Wittock, France/Belgium/Luxembourg
- 2020: No Hard Feelings, Faraz Shariat, Germany
- 2019: Adam, Rhys Ernst, USA
- 2018: We The Animals, Jeremiah Zagar, USA
- 2017: Beach Rats, Eliza Hittman, USA
- 2016: The Ornithologist (O Ornitólogo), João Pedro Rodrigues, Portugal/France/Brazil
- 2015: Sworn Virgin (2015 film) (Vergine giurat), Laura Bispuri, Italy/Switzerland/Germany/Albania
- 2014: Something Must Break (Nånting måste gå sönder), Ester Martin Bergsmark, Sweden
- 2013: Rosie (Rosie), Marcel Gisler, Germany
- 2012: Keep the Lights On, Ira Sachs, United States
- 2011: Trigger, Bruce McDonald, Canada
- 2010: 80 Days (80 Egunean), Jon Garaño & José Mari Goenaga, Spain
- 2009: Morrer como um homem, João Pedro Rodrigues, France/Portugal
- 2008: My Friend from Faro (Mein Freund aus Faro), Nana Neul, Germany
- 2007: Les Témoins, André Téchiné, France
- 2006: Whole New Thing, Amnon Buchbinder, Canada
- 2005: Cachorro, Miguel Albaladejo, Spain
- 2004: Do I Love You?, Lisa Gornick, UK
- 2003: Oi! Warning, Benjamin & Dominik Reding, Germany

Student Jury Award for Best Short Film

- 2021: Son of Sodom, Thea Montoya, Colombia
- 2020: Hugo at 6:30pm, Helloco Simon, France
- 2019: Crash and Burn, Honey, Dawid Ullgren, Sweden
- 2018: Pre-Drink, Marc-Antoine Lemire, Canada
- 2017: Tranzicija, Milica Tomović, Serbia
- 2016: Takk for turen, Henrik Martin Dahlsbakken, Norway
- 2015: 9:55–11:00, Ingrid Ekman, Bergsgatan 4B, Cristine Berglund & Sophie Vukovic, Sweden
- 2014: Vacance, Hyun-Ju Lee, South Korea
- 2013: Ta av mig, Victor Lindgren, Sweden
- 2012: Dont brejk maj Turbofolk hart, Miona Bogovic, Serbia/Germany
- 2011: Two Beds, Kanoko Wynkoop, United States
- 2010: Tom, Nimrod Shapira, Israel
- 2009: Haboged, Tomer Velkoff, Israel
- 2008: Bræðrabylta, Grímur Hákonarson, Iceland
- 2007: Who's the Top?, Jennie Livingston, USA
- 2006: Offerte speciali, Gianni Gatti, Italy
- 2005: Kär i natten, Håkon Liu, Sweden
- 2004: Thick Lips Thin Lips, Paul Lee, Canada

Audience Award for Best Feature Film

- 2021: Law of Love, Barbora Chalupová, Czech Republic
- 2020: Lola, Laurent Micheli, Belgium
- 2019: And Then We Danced, Levan Akin, Georgia, Sweden, France
- 2018: The Miseducation of Cameron Post, Desiree Akhavan, USA
- 2017: God's Own Country, Francis Lee, UK
- 2016: The Queen of Ireland, Conor Horgan, Ireland
- 2015: Antonia's Line (Antonia), Marleen Gorris, Netherlands/Belgium/UK
- 2014: Children 404 (Дети-404), Askold Kurov & Pavel Loparev, Russia
- 2013: Any Day Now, Travis Fine, USA
- 2012: Cloudburst, Thom Fitzgerald, Canada
- 2011: Weekend, Andrew Haigh, UK
- 2010: Sasha, Dennis Todorović, Germany
- 2009: Patrik 1,5, Ella Lemhagen, Sweden
- 2008: Breakfast with Scot, Laurie Lynd, Canada
- 2007: The Bubble (Ha-Buah), Eytan Fox, Israel
- 2006: Whole New Thing, Amnon Buchbinder, Canada
- 2005: Supper Man, Albert Vlk, Slovakia
- 2004: Mambo Italiano, Émile Gaudreault, USA/Canada
- 2003: Together (Tillsammans), Lukas Moodysson, Sweden/Denmark/Italy
- 2002: Le fate ignoranti, Ferzan Özpetek, Italy/France
- 2001: All About My Mother (Todo sombre mi madre), Pedro Almodóvar, Spain/France

== See also ==
- List of LGBT film festivals
- List of film festivals in the Czech Republic
