= Aaron Webber =

Canadian actor

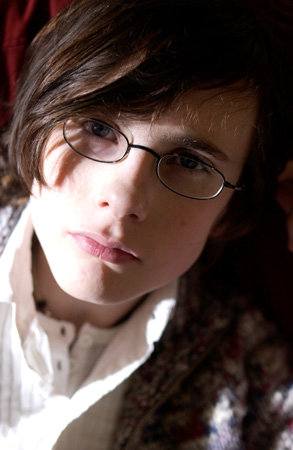
- Webber in 2005
- Born: Aaron James Teahan Webber; June 20, 1989 (age 37); Chester Basin, Nova Scotia, Canada
- Occupation: Actor
- Years active: 2004–present
- Political party: New Democratic Party; Nova Scotia New Democratic Party

Aaron James Teahan Webber (born June 20, 1989) is a Canadian actor best known for his roles as Emerson Thorsen in the drama film Whole New Thing (2005) and Thomas in the drama film A Stone's Throw (2006).

== Early life ==
Webber was born in Chester Basin, Nova Scotia, Canada, and started acting in community theatre at age six. He trained at the Chester Summer Theatre Performance School between ages 11 and 16.

== Career ==
Prior to his first feature film, Webber played numerous roles in several Chester Playhouse productions, including Mortimer in The Fantasticks and the title roles in both Peter Pan and Charlie and the Chocolate Factory. While playing Gollum in The Hobbit, Webber grabbed the attention of producer Camelia Frieberg, and was asked to audition for the lead role of Emerson in Whole New Thing.

Webber was the first to audition for Whole New Thing and director Amnon Buchbinder and co-writer Daniel MacIvor cast him immediately, cutting short an anticipated countrywide search for the all-important role of Emerson. After winning a 2005 Atlantic Canada Award for Outstanding Performance by an Actor, Webber went on to play the supporting role of Thomas in Frieberg's directorial début, A Stone's Throw. Following that he once again played the lead for Buchbinder in an experimental short called The Traveling Medicine Show.

== Personal life ==
Webber currently lives in Toronto, Ontario. He is friends with actress Molly Dunsworth He is a long time member and former political operative of the New Democratic Party.

== Selected filmography ==
Year	Film	Role	Notes
2013	Sex & Violence (TV series)	Toby	Lead
2012	Epiphany	Daniel	Lead
2012	Call Me Fitz	Nerdy Man	One episode
2011	The Factory Block	Max	Lead (short film, co-starred with Molly Dunsworth)
2009	The Last New Year	Sebastian	Principal
2008	Travelling Medicine Show: 1. Creation	Max	Lead
2006	A Stone's Throw	Thomas	Principal
2005	Whole New Thing	Emerson	Lead, Atlantic Canadian Award, Outstanding Performance by an Actor - Male (shared with Daniel MacIvor)
2004	A Summer Fling	Jimmy	Lead

== Awards and nominations ==
- Atlantic Film Festival
  - Won the Atlantic Canadian Award, Category: Outstanding Performance by an Actor - Male for Whole New Thing (2005)

== See also ==
- List of former child actors from Canada
