= David Buchbinder =

David Buchbinder may refer to:

- David Buchbinder (academic) (born 1947), Australian professor of literature and cultural studies
- David Buchbinder (musician) (fl. 1990s–2020s), Canadian-American musician

== See also ==
- David Bookbinder (1940/41–2023), British politician
