= The Abduction of Rebecca =

1846 painting by Eugène Delacroix

- Rebecca Abducted at the Order of the Templar Bois-Guilbert during the Sack of the Castle of Front-de-Boeuf
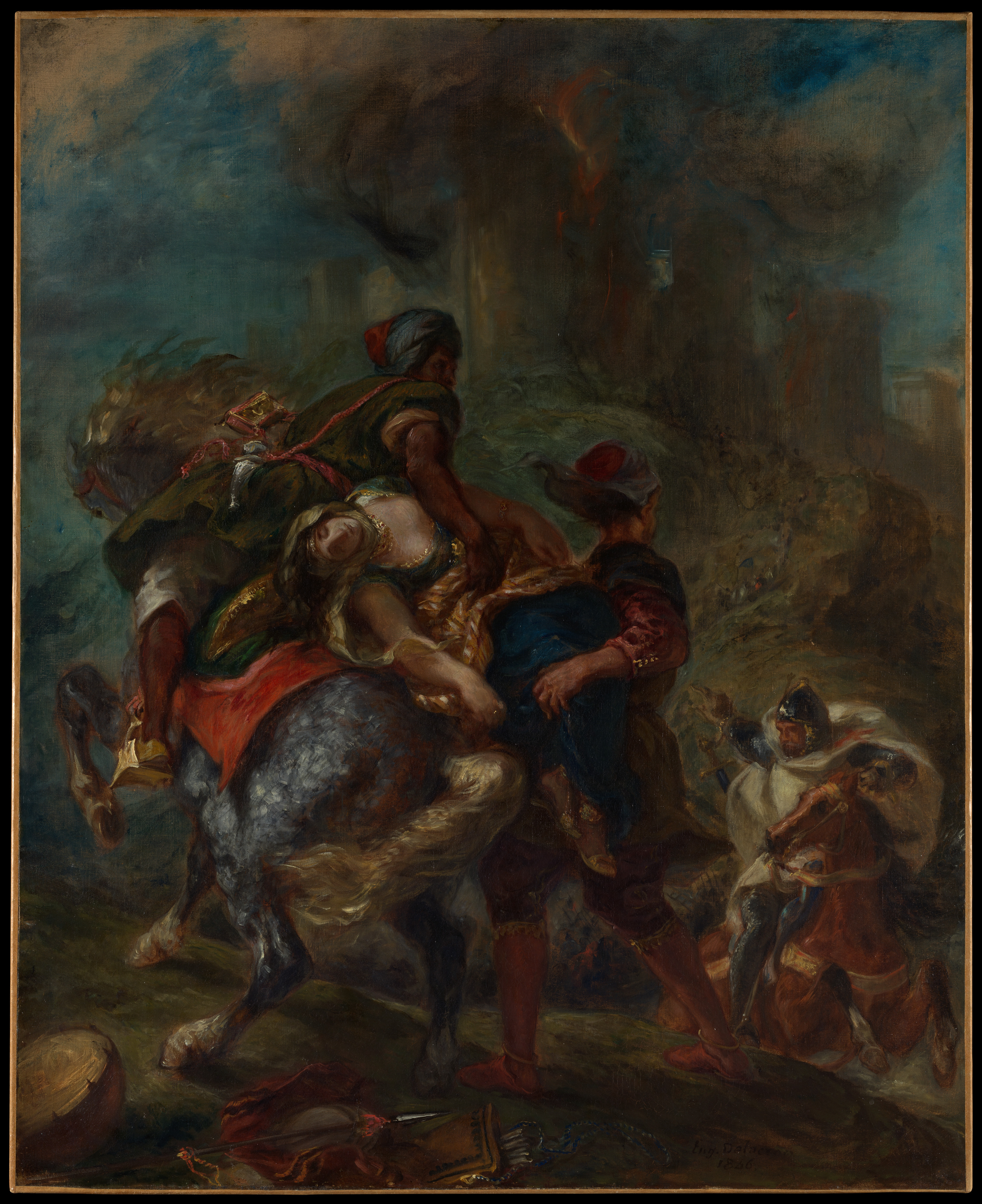
- Version of the painting in the collection of the Metropolitan Museum of Art
- Artist: Eugène Delacroix
- Year: 1846
- Medium: Oil on canvas
- Dimensions: 100.3 cm × 81.9 cm (39.5 in × 32.2 in)

The Abduction of Rebecca is a mid-19th century painting by French artist Eugène Delacroix. Done in oil on canvas, the work depicts the a scene from Sir Walter Scott's novel Ivanhoe in which the heroine Rebecca is abducted. Delacroix produced the painting during the height of the French Romanticist Movement, and presented the work at the Paris Salon of 1846. The 1846 version of Abduction is currently in the collection of the Metropolitan Museum of Art, which describes the work as "one of Delacroix’s greatest paintings". In 1858 Delacroix created an almost identical work for the Paris Salon of 1859; the second version of Abduction is in the collection of the Louvre.
