= Stud Brno =

Czech activist association

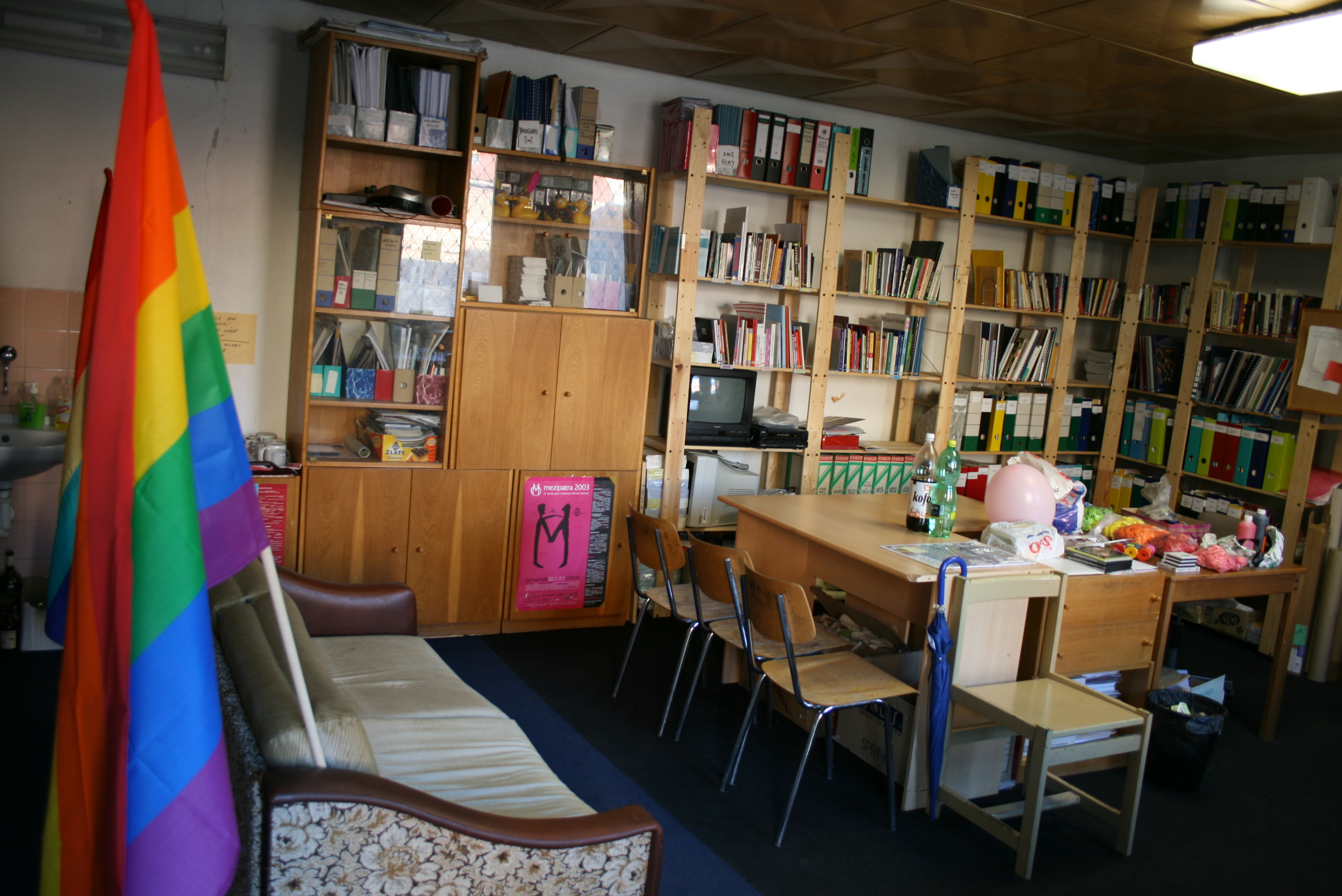
STUD's office

STUD Brno is a Czech activist association of lesbians, gays, and their friends.

== Basic facts ==
STUD was established in 1996 as an independent non-government as well as non-profit organization (civic association), the mission of which is to benefit the gay, lesbian, bisexual, and transgender minority, and to aim for legal and factual equality of their rights with other members and groups of the society. The name of the organization is abbreviated from ″students″. The full name was originally STUD-lgb and it meant ″lesbian, gay & bisexual students".

STUD gathers people of homosexual and bisexual orientation, and their heterosexual allies. STUD counted some thirty members at the beginning of 2010. STUD is an all-volunteer group, except for one paid half-time staff member. It was an active member of The Association of Gay and Lesbian Citizens‘ Organizations in the Czech Republic (SOHO) until its transformation in 2000. In 2003 STUD became a constituent member of the Gay & Lesbian League (GLL).

== Activities ==
- Queer Ball – annual LGBT dance event, nominated for 2014 bePROUD Award (since 2013)
- Mezipatra Queer Film Festival – formerly called Duha nad Brnem (The Rainbow above Brno); the annual LGBT film festival, held every November, supported by US Embassy in Prague and many others. In 2009, the festival was attended by 12,000 viewers in Brno and in Prague, and screened some 100 films. (since 2000)
- Queer Library – community centre with LGBT library and archives (since 2001)
- GaTe (Gay Teens) – a project supporting the process of self-discovery and self-acceptance of teenage gays. (since 2003)
- Good for children in all families – a petition supporting legislative changes for same-sex partners children adoption (2010)
- Campaign in support of the Act of Registered Partnership – a long-term campaign including petitioning, educational events, internet information project, and the 2002 media campaign "It Will Help Some But Hurt None". (1998–2006)
- Gay & Lesbian Helpline – counselling service over the phone (2001–2005)
- Light for AIDS – an annual event within the global campaign International AIDS Candlelight Memorial (1997–2003)
- The Czech-Slovak Gathering of Gays, Lesbians and Their Supporters – an annual cross-border gathering held alternately in Czechia and Slovakia and coordinated with the Slovak partner organisation Ganymedes Movement Bratislava (1997–2002)
- Studna – a magazine of Brno’s lesbians and gays (1997–2002)
- The Gay Man of the Czech Republic – a national contest for the most attractive Czech gay man (1998 & 2000)

== Sources ==
- Seidl, Jan (2012). "5/4/3". Od žaláře k oltáři : emancipace homosexuality v českých zemích od roku 1867 do současnosti (in Czech). Brno: Host. p. 584. ISBN 978-80-7294-585-6.
- Navrátil, Jiří (2005). STUD, organizace sociálního hnutí v politologické perspektivě (in Czech). Brno: Masaryk University, Faculty of Social Studies. p. 17.
- Tešnarová, Tereza (2006). "4.4". Současnost a budoucnost veřejného prostoru gay a lesbické subkultury (in Czech). Brno: Masaryk University, Faculty of Economics and Administration.
- Smejkalová, Lenka (2012). Rámování politických požadavků českého gay-lesbického hnutí v období od roku 2000 (in Czech). Brno: Masaryk University, Faculty of Social Studies. p. 26.
- Analysis of the Situation of Lesbian, Gay, Bisexual and Transgender Minority in the Czech Republic (PDF). Prague: Office of the Government of the Czech Republic. October 2007. p. 17 & 68.
- Katerina Nedbalkova: The Changing Space of the Gay and Lesbian Community in the Czech Republic, p. 76. In "Beyond the Pink Curtain. Everyday Life of LGBT People in Eastern Europe". Politike-Symposion, 2007.
- Richard Ammon: Gay Czech Republic. globalgayz.com, April 2009.
