= The Fishing Trip =

- Directed by: Amnon Buchbinder
- Written by: Michelle Lovretta
- Produced by: Amnon Buchbinder; Anna Newallo; Camelia Frieberg
- Starring: Jhene Erwin; Melissa Hood; Anna Henry
- Cinematography: Derek Rogers
- Edited by: Roushell Goldstein
- Music by: David Buchbinder
- Production company: Resounding Pictures
- Distributed by: Mongrel Media
- Release date: September 14, 1998 (TIFF)
- Running time: 84 minutes
- Country: Canada
- Language: English

The Fishing Trip is a Canadian drama film, directed by Amnon Buchbinder and released in 1998. The film stars Jhene Erwin as Kirsti, a young woman who is travelling with her sister Jessie (Melissa Hood) and their friend Murdoch (Anna Henry) to Kirsti and Jessie's father's fishing cabin, to confront their father about his history of committing sexual abuse against them in childhood.

The film, made while Buchbinder was a student at the Canadian Film Centre, was shot in St. Joseph Island and Sault Ste. Marie, Ontario.

The film received two Genie Award nominations at the 19th Genie Awards, for Best Supporting Actress (Henry) and Best Original Song (Suzie Ungerleider for "River Blue"). Ungerleider won the award for Best Original Song.
