= Ivanhoe =

1820 novel by Walter Scott

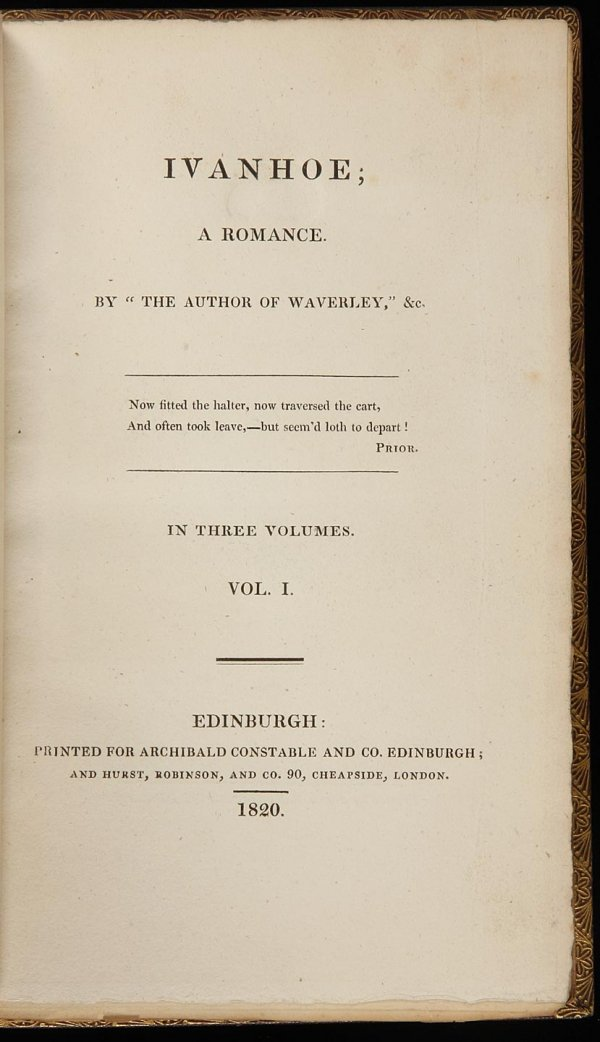
- Title page of 1st edition (1820, but released in December 1819)
- Author: Walter Scott
- Language: English
- Series: Waverley Novels
- Genre: Historical novel, chivalric romance
- Publisher: Archibald Constable (Edinburgh); Hurst, Robinson, and Co. (London)
- Publication date: 20 December 1819
- Publication place: Great Britain
- Media type: Print
- Pages: 401 (Edinburgh Edition, 1998)
- Preceded by: A Legend of Montrose
- Followed by: The Monastery
- Text: Ivanhoe at Wikisource

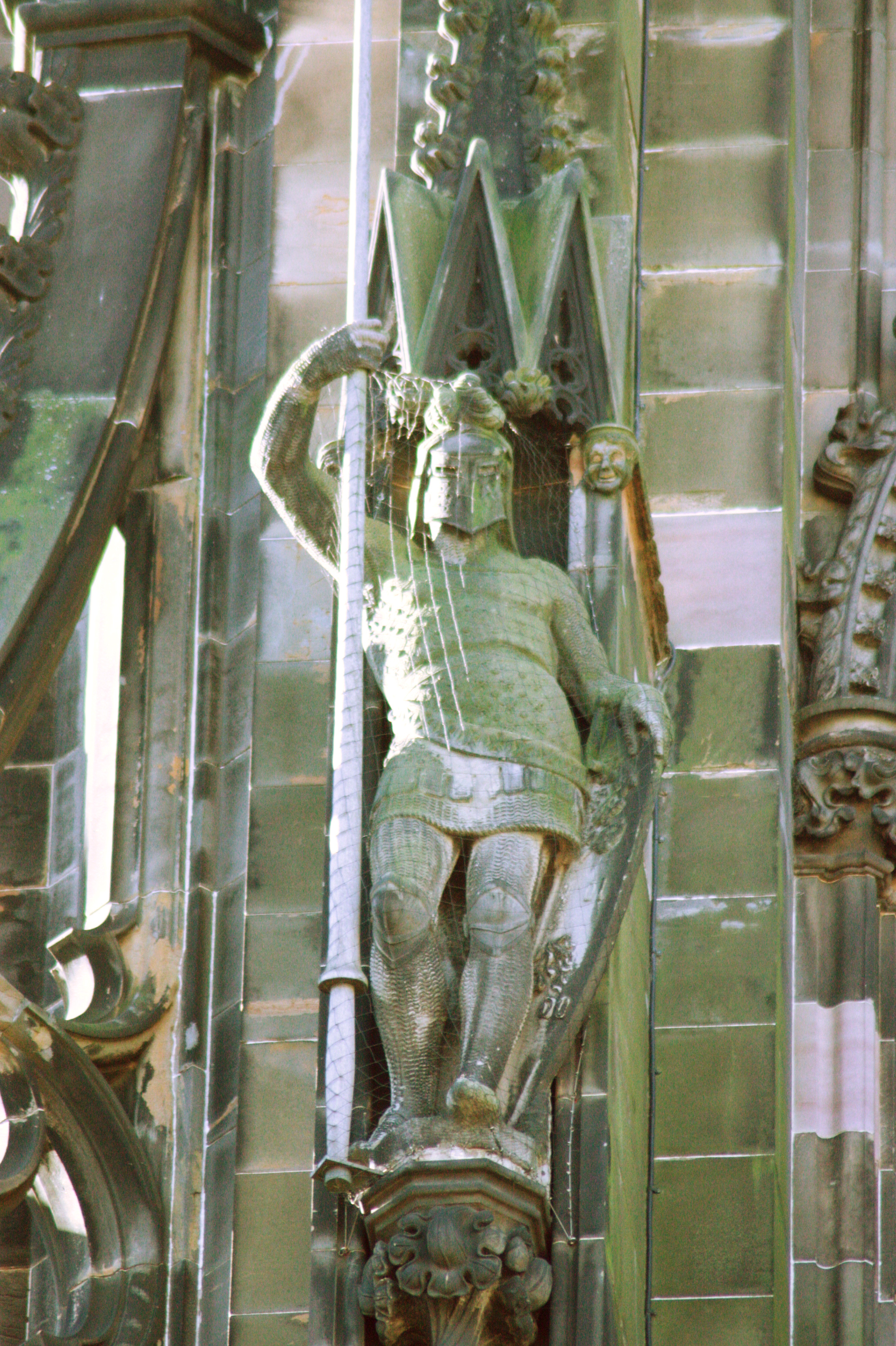
Ivanhoe on the Scott Monument, Edinburgh (sculpted by John Rhind)

Ivanhoe: A Romance (/ˈaɪvənhoʊ/ EYE-vən-hoh) by Walter Scott is a historical novel published in three volumes, in December 1819, as one of the Waverley novels. The Waverley novels are considered seminal to the genre of historical fiction, and Ivanhoe became by far the best-known entry in the whole cycle of nearly thirty books.

Ivanhoe marked a shift away from Scott's prior practice of setting stories in Scotland during centuries closer to the one from which he wrote his books (1814–1831). Whereas earlier numbers in the Waverley series take place in the 16th and 17th centuries, Ivanhoe is set in the high-medieval past during the 1190s. Over time it became Scott's best-remembered and most beloved novel, with many adaptations of the work in the twentieth century.

Set in England in the Middle Ages, with colourful descriptions of a tournament, outlaws, a witch trial, and divisions between Jews and Christians, Normans and Saxons, the novel was credited by many, including Thomas Carlyle and John Ruskin, with inspiring increased interest in chivalric romance and medievalism. As John Henry Newman put it, Scott "had first turned men's minds in the direction of the Middle Ages". It was also credited with influencing contemporary popular perceptions of historical figures such as King Richard the Lionheart, Prince John, and Robin Hood.

C.S. Lewis writes, "It was known that Adam went naked before till he fell. After that, people pictured the whole past in terms of their own age. [...] Milton never doubted that [the common English dish] 'capon and white broth' would have been as familiar to Christ and the disciples as it was to himself. It is doubtful whether the sense of period is much older than the Waverley novels. It is hardly present in Gibbon's Decline and Fall of the Roman Empire, published 1776."

== Composition and sources ==
In June 1819, Walter Scott still suffered from the severe stomach pains that had forced him to dictate the last part of The Bride of Lammermoor, and also most of A Legend of the Wars of Montrose, which he finished at the end of May. By the beginning of July, at the latest, Scott had started dictating his new novel Ivanhoe, again with John Ballantyne and William Laidlaw as amanuenses. For the second half of the manuscript, Scott was able to take up the pen, and completed Ivanhoe: A Romance in early November 1819.

For detailed information about the Middle Ages Scott drew on three works by the antiquarian Joseph Strutt: Horda Angel-cynnan or a Compleat View of the Manners, Customs, Arms, Habits etc. of the Inhabitants of England (1775–76), Dress and Habits of the People of England (1796–99), and Sports and Pastimes of the People of England (1801). Two historians gave him a solid grounding in the period: Robert Henry with The History of Great Britain (1771–93), and Sharon Turner with The History of the Anglo-Saxons from the Earliest Period to the Norman Conquest (1799–1805). His clearest debt to an original medieval source involved the Templar Rule, reproduced in The Theatre of Honour and Knight-Hood (1623) translated from the French of André Favine. Scott was happy to introduce details from the later Middle Ages, and Chaucer was particularly helpful, as (in a different way) was the fourteenth-century romance Richard Coeur de Lion. The figure of Locksley in the story and many elements of the tale are undoubtedly influenced by Scott's association with Joseph Ritson, who had earlier compiled Robin Hood: a collection of all the ancient poems, songs and ballads now extant relative to that celebrated English outlaw (1795).

== Editions ==
Ivanhoe was published by Archibald Constable in Edinburgh. All first editions carry the date of 1820, but it was released on 20 December 1819 and issued in London on the 29th by Hurst, Robinson and Co.. As with all of the Waverley novels before 1827, publication was anonymous. The print run was 10,000 copies, and the cost was £1 10s (£1.50, equivalent in purchasing power to £149 in 2021). It is possible that Scott was involved in minor changes to the text during the early 1820s but his main revision was carried out in 1829 for the 'Magnum' edition where the novel appeared in Volumes 16 and 17 in September and October 1830.

The standard modern edition, by Graham Tulloch, appeared as Volume 8 of the Edinburgh Edition of the Waverley Novels in 1998: this is based on the first edition with emendations principally from Scott's manuscript in the second half of the work; the new Magnum material is included in Volume 25b.

== Plot summary ==
Ivanhoe focuses on one of the remaining Anglo-Saxon noble families when the nobility in England was overwhelmingly Norman. Set in 1194, It follows the Saxon protagonist, Sir Wilfred of Ivanhoe, who is out of favour with his father for Sir Wilfred's allegiance to the Norman king Richard the Lionheart. After the failure of the Third Crusade, many Crusaders were still returning to their homes in Europe. King Richard, who had been captured by Leopold of Austria on his return journey to England, was believed to still be in captivity.

=== Opening ===
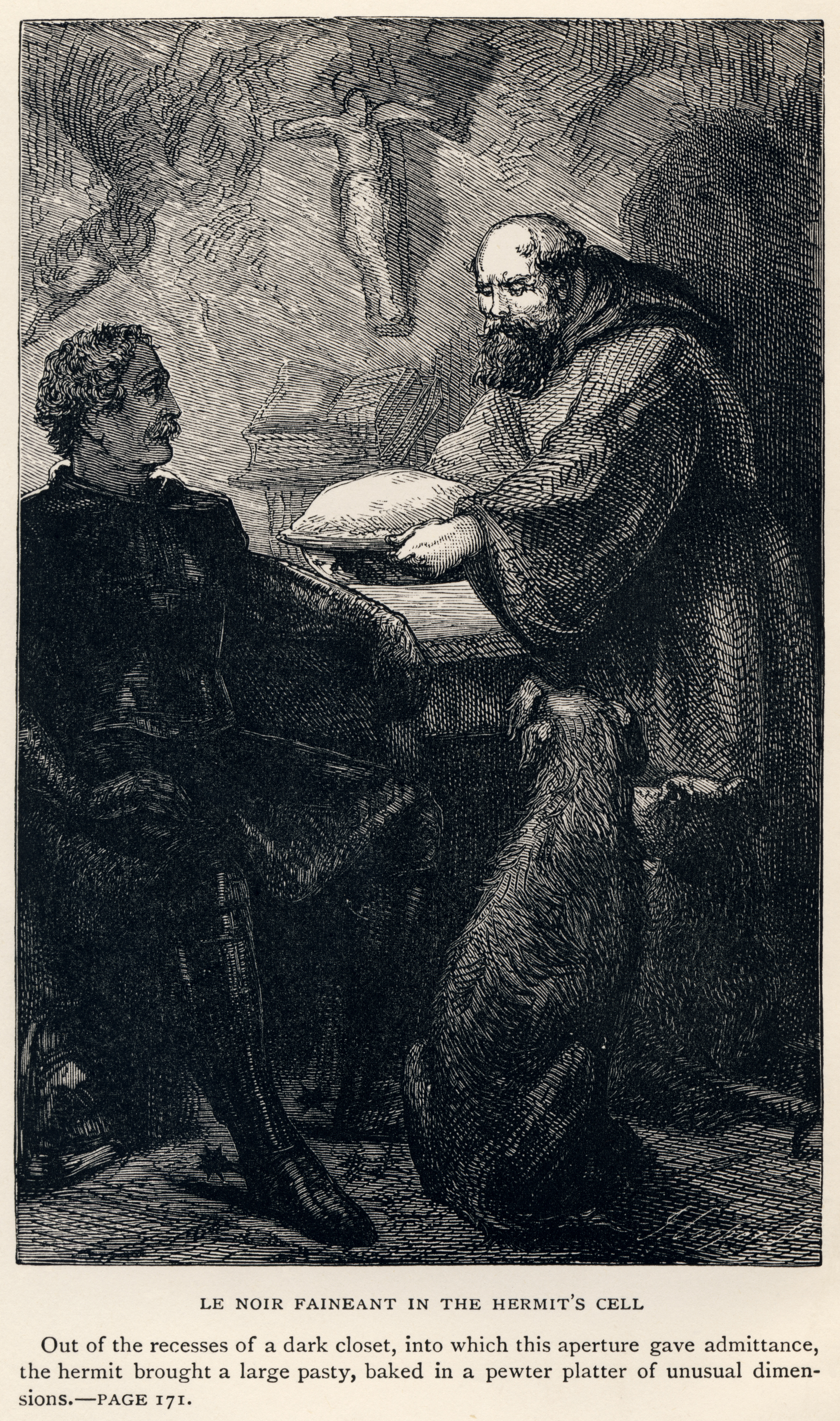
Le Noir Faineant in the Hermit's Cell by J. Cooper, Sr. From an 1886 edition of Walter Scott's works

Protagonist Wilfred of Ivanhoe is disinherited by his father Cedric of Rotherwood for supporting the Norman King Richard and for falling in love with the Lady Rowena, a ward of Cedric and descendant of the Saxon Kings of England. Cedric planned to have Rowena marry the powerful Lord Athelstane, a pretender to the Crown of England by his descent from the last Saxon King, Harold Godwinson. Ivanhoe accompanies King Richard on the Third Crusade, where he is said to have played a notable role in the Siege of Acre.

The book opens with a scene of Norman knights and prelates seeking the hospitality of Cedric. They are guided there by a pilgrim, known at that time as a palmer. That same night, Isaac of York, a Jewish moneylender, seeks refuge at Rotherwood on his way to the tournament at Ashby. Following the night's meal, the palmer observes one of the Normans, the Templar Brian de Bois-Guilbert, issue orders to his Saracen soldiers to capture Isaac.

The palmer then assists in Isaac's escape from Rotherwood, with the additional aid of the swineherd Gurth.

Isaac of York offers to repay his debt to the palmer with a suit of armour and a war horse to participate in the tournament at Ashby-de-la-Zouch Castle, on his inference that the palmer was secretly a knight. The palmer is taken by surprise, but accepts the offer.

=== The tournament ===
The tournament is presided over by Prince John. Also in attendance are Cedric, Athelstane, Lady Rowena, Isaac of York, his daughter Rebecca, Robin of Locksley and his men, Prince John's advisor Waldemar Fitzurse, and numerous Norman knights.

On the first day of the tournament, in a bout of individual jousting, a mysterious knight, identifying himself only as "Desdichado" (described in the book as Spanish, taken by the Saxons to mean "Disinherited"), defeats Bois-Guilbert. The masked knight declines to reveal himself despite Prince John's request, but is nevertheless declared the champion of the day and is permitted to choose the Queen of the Tournament. He bestows this honour upon Lady Rowena.

On the second day, at a melee, Desdichado is the leader of one party, opposed by his former adversaries. Desdichado's side is soon hard-pressed and he himself beset by multiple foes until rescued by a knight nicknamed Le Noir Faineant ('the Black Sluggard'), who thereafter departs in secret. When forced to unmask himself to receive his coronet (the sign of championship), Desdichado is identified as Wilfred of Ivanhoe, returned from the Crusades. This causes much consternation to Prince John and his court who now fear the imminent return of King Richard.

Ivanhoe is severely wounded in the competition yet his father does not move quickly to tend to him. Instead, Rebecca, a skilled physician, tends to him while they are lodged near the tournament and then convinces her father to take Ivanhoe with them to their home in York when he is fit for that trip. The conclusion of the tournament includes feats of archery by Locksley, such as splitting a willow reed with his arrow. Prince John's dinner for the local Saxons ends in insults.

=== Capture and rescue ===
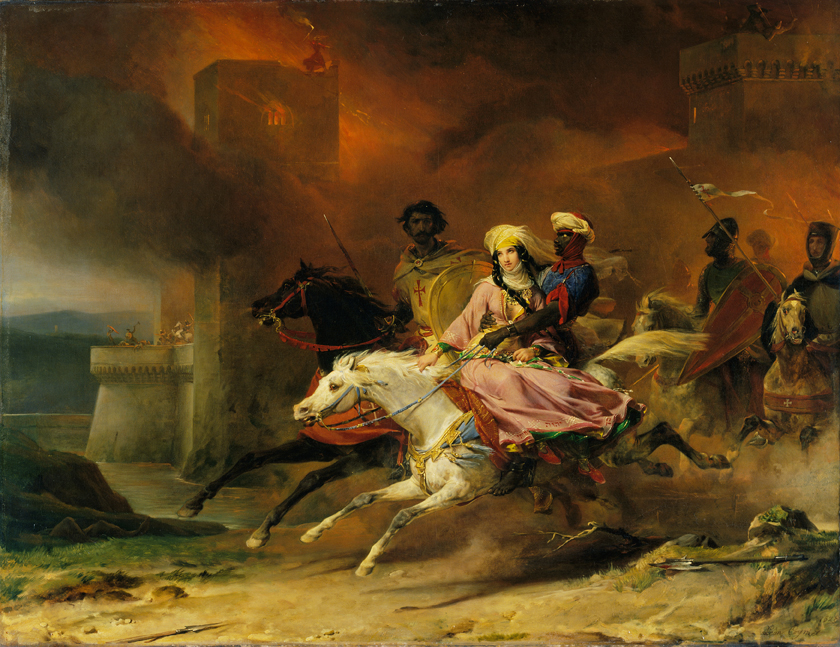
Rebecca and Brian de Bois-Guilbert by Leon Cogniet, 1828

In the forests between Ashby and York, Isaac, Rebecca and the wounded Ivanhoe are abandoned by their guards, who fear bandits and take all of Isaac's horses. Cedric, Athelstane and the Lady Rowena meet them and agree to travel together. The party is captured by de Bracy and his companions and taken to Torquilstone, the castle of Front-de-Bœuf. The swineherd Gurth and Wamba the jester manage to escape, and then encounter Locksley, who plans a rescue.

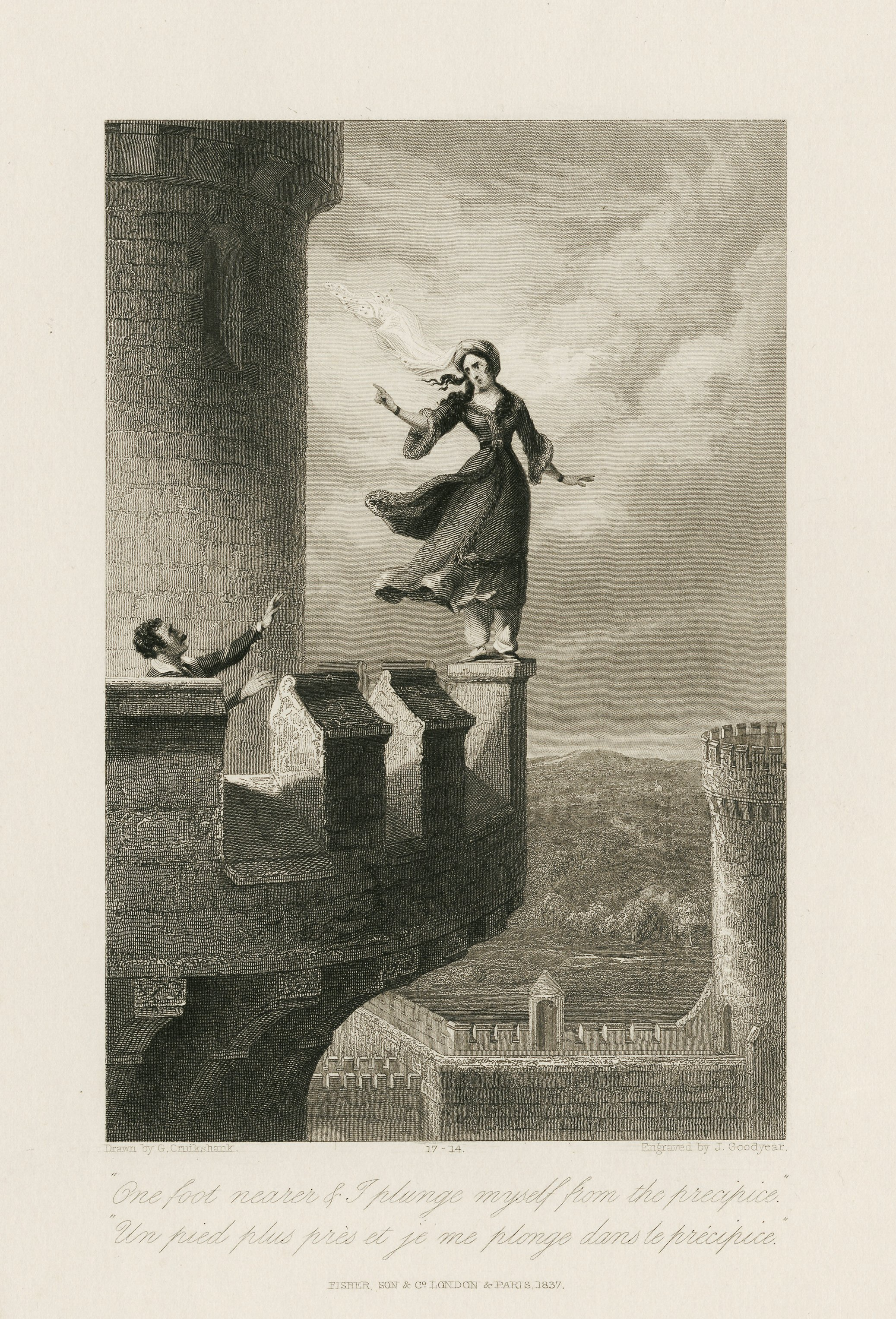
Rebecca on the parapet of Torquilstone castle, drawing by George Cruikshank (1837)

The Black Knight, having taken refuge for the night in the hut of local friar, the Holy Clerk of Copmanhurst, volunteers his assistance on learning about the captives from Robin of Locksley. They then besiege the Castle of Torquilstone with Robin's own men, including the friar and assorted Saxon yeomen. Inside Torquilstone, de Bracy expresses his love for the Lady Rowena but is refused. Brian de Bois-Guilbert tries to rape Rebecca and is thwarted. He then tries to seduce her and is rebuffed. Front-de-Bœuf tries to wring a hefty ransom from Isaac of York, but Isaac refuses to pay unless his daughter is freed.

When the besiegers deliver a note to yield up the captives, their Norman captors demand a priest to administer the Final Sacrament to Cedric; whereupon Cedric's jester Wamba slips in disguised as a priest, and takes the place of Cedric, who escapes and brings important information to the besiegers on the strength of the garrison and its layout. On his way out, Cedric meets the Saxon crone Ulrica, who vows revenge on Front-de-Bœuf and advises Cedric to tell the besiegers. The besiegers storm the castle. The castle is set aflame during the assault by Ulrica, the daughter of the original lord of the castle, Lord Torquilstone, as revenge for her father's death. Front-de-Bœuf is killed in the fire while de Bracy surrenders to the Black Knight, who identifies himself as King Richard and releases de Bracy. Bois-Guilbert escapes with Rebecca while Isaac is captured by the Clerk of Copmanhurst. The Lady Rowena is saved by Cedric, while the still-wounded Ivanhoe is rescued from the burning castle by King Richard. In the fighting, Athelstane is wounded and presumed dead while attempting to rescue Rebecca, whom he mistakes for Rowena.

=== Rebecca's trial and Ivanhoe's reconciliation ===
Following the battle, Locksley plays host to King Richard. Word is conveyed by de Bracy to Prince John of the King's return and the fall of Torquilstone. In the meantime, Bois-Guilbert rushes with his captive to the nearest Templar Preceptory, where Lucas de Beaumanoir, the Grand Master of the Templars, takes umbrage at Bois-Guilbert's infatuation and subjects Rebecca to a trial for witchcraft. At Bois-Guilbert's secret request, she claims the right to trial by combat; and Bois-Guilbert, who had hoped to fight as Rebecca's champion, is devastated when the Grand Master orders him to fight on behalf of the Templestowe. Rebecca then writes to her father to procure a champion for her. Cedric organizes Athelstane's funeral at Coningsburgh, in the midst of which the Black Knight arrives with Ivanhoe. Cedric, who had not been present at Locksley's carousal, is ill-disposed towards the knight upon learning his true identity, but Richard calms Cedric and reconciles him with his son. During this conversation, Athelstane emerges—not dead, but laid in his coffin alive by monks desirous of the funeral money. Over Cedric's renewed protests, Athelstane pledges his homage to the Norman King Richard and urges Cedric to allow Rowena to marry Ivanhoe, to which Cedric finally agrees.

Soon after this reconciliation, Ivanhoe receives word from Isaac beseeching him to fight on Rebecca's behalf. Ivanhoe, riding day and night, arrives in time for the trial by combat; however, both horse and man are exhausted, with little chance of victory. Bois-Guilbert refuses to fight but Ivanhoe accuses him of breaking his word and the Templar reacts fiercely. His face becomes flushed and he is ready for combat. The two knights make one charge at each other with lances, Bois-Guilbert appearing to have the advantage. Ivanhoe and his horse go down, but Bois-Guilbert also falls though barely touched. Ivanhoe quickly gets up to finish the fight with his sword, but Bois-Guilbert does not rise and dies a victim of his own contending passions.

Ivanhoe and Rowena marry and live a long and happy life together. Fearing further persecution, Rebecca and her father plan to quit England for Granada. Before leaving, Rebecca comes to Rowena shortly after the wedding to bid her a solemn farewell. Ivanhoe's military service ends with the death of King Richard five years later.

== Characters ==
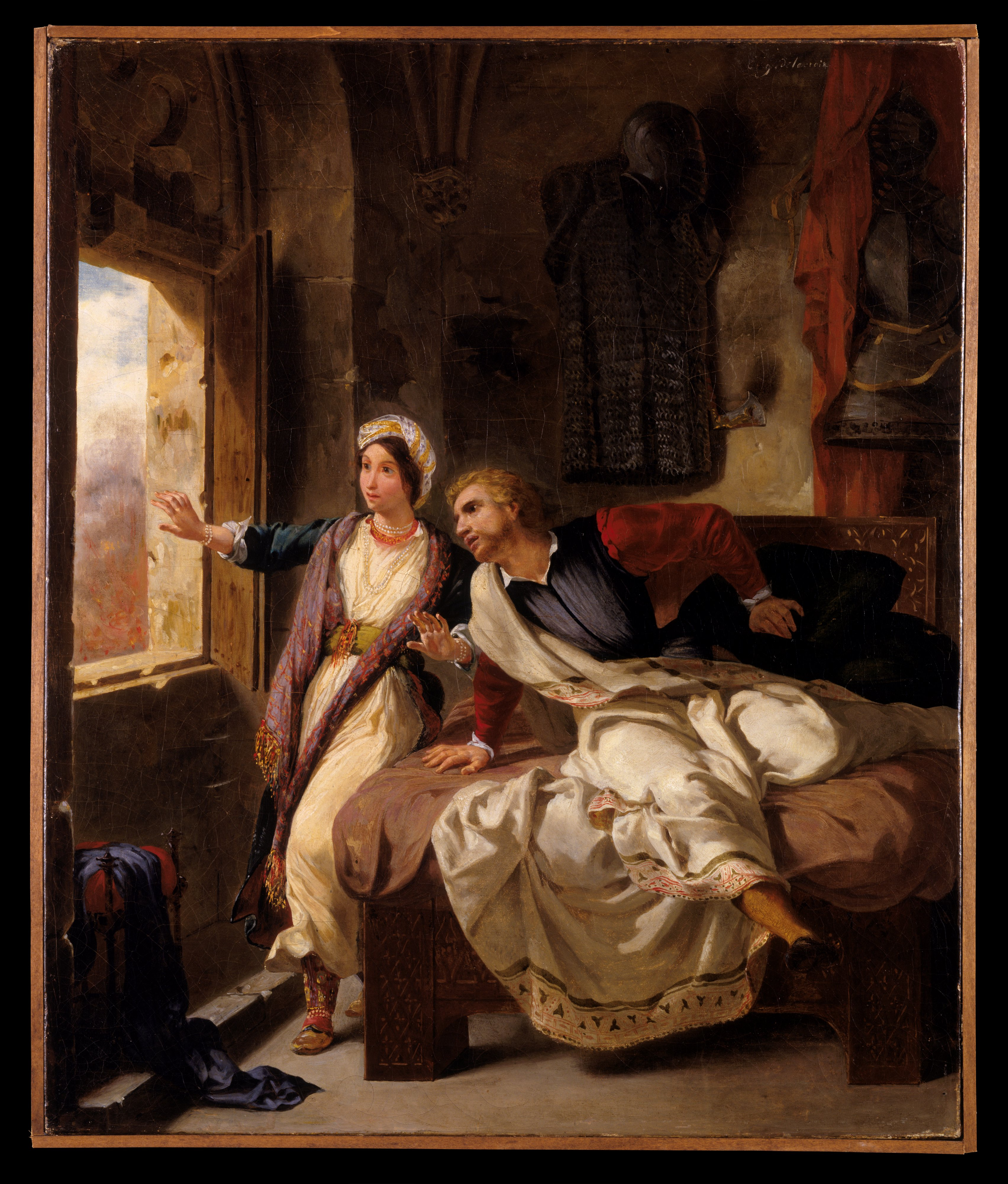
Rebecca and the Wounded Ivanhoe by Eugène Delacroix, 1823

(principal characters in bold)

- **Cedric** the Saxon, of Rotherwood
- **Wilfred of Ivanhoe**, Cedric's son
- **Rowena**, Saxon princess, Cedric's ward
- **Athelstane**, Saxon nobleman, Cedric's kinsman
- **Gurth**, Cedric's swineherd
- **Wamba**, Cedric's jester
- Oswald, Cedric's cup-bearer
- Elgitha, Rowena's waiting-woman
- Albert Malvoisin, Preceptor of Templestowe
- Philip Malvoisin, his brother, Cedric's neighbor
- Hubert, Philip's forester
- **The Prior of Aymer**, Abbot of Jorvaulx
- Ambrose, a monk attending him
- **Brian de Bois-Guilbert**, a Templar
- Baldwin, his squire
- **Isaac** of York, a Jewish money-lender
- **Rebecca**, of York, Isaac's daughter, an accomplished physician and philanthropist
- Nathan, a rabbi and physician
- **King Richard** ('the Black Knight')
- Prince John, Richard's brother
- Alias **Locksley**, Robin Hood, an outlaw
- **Reginald Front-de-Bœuf** of Torquilstone, Norman holder of an ancient Saxon fortress. Cedric's neighbor
- **Maurice de Bracy**, a Free Companion (mercenary)
- Waldemar Fitzurse, Prince John's advisor—a fictional son of Reginald FitzUrse, a murderer of Archbishop Becket.
- Hugh de Grantmesnil
- Ralph de Vipont, a Hospitaller
- **Friar Tuck**, of Copmanhurst
- **Ulrica**, of Torquilstone, alias Urfried
- **Lucas de Beaumanoir**, grand-master of the Templars
- Conrade Mountfitchet, his attendant knight
- Higg, a peasant
- Kirjath Jairam of Leicester, a rich Jew
- Alan-a-Dale, a minstrel

== Chapter summary ==
Dedicatory Epistle: An imaginary letter to the Rev. Dr Dryasdust from Laurence Templeton who has found the materials for the following tale mostly in the Anglo-Norman Wardour Manuscript. He wishes to provide an English counterpart to the preceding Waverley novels, in spite of various difficulties arising from the chronologically remote setting made necessary by the earlier progress of civilisation south of the Border.

=== Volume One ===
Ch. 1: Historical sketch. Gurth the swineherd and Wamba the jester discuss life under Norman rule.

Ch. 2: Wamba and Gurth wilfully misdirect a group of horsemen headed by Prior Aymer and Brian de Bois-Guilbert seeking shelter at Cedric's Rotherwood. Aymer and Bois-Guilbert discuss the beauty of Cedric's ward Rowena and are redirected, this time correctly, by a palmer [Ivanhoe in disguise].

Ch. 3: Cedric anxiously awaits the return of Gurth and the pigs. Aymer and Bois-Guilbert arrive.

Ch. 4: Bois-Guilbert admires Rowena as she enters for the evening feast.

Ch. 5: During the feast: Isaac enters and is befriended by the palmer; Cedric laments the decay of the Saxon language; the palmer refutes Bois-Guilbert's assertion of Templar supremacy with an account of a tournament in Palestine, where Ivanhoe defeated him; the palmer and Rowena give a pledge for a return match; and Isaac is thunderstruck by Bois-Guilbert's denial of his assertion of poverty.

Ch. 6: Next day the palmer tells Rowena that Ivanhoe will soon be home. He offers to protect Isaac from Bois-Guilbert, whom he has overheard giving instructions for his capture. On the road to Sheffield Isaac mentions a source of horse and armour of which he guesses the palmer has need.

Ch. 7: As the audience for a tournament at Ashby de la Zouch assembles, Prince John amuses himself by making fun of Athelstane and Isaac.

Ch. 8: After a series of Saxon defeats in the tournament the 'Disinherited Knight' [Ivanhoe] triumphs over Bois-Guilbert and the other Norman challengers.

Ch. 9: The Disinherited Knight nominates Rowena as Queen of the Tournament.

Ch. 10: The Disinherited Knight refuses to ransom Bois-Guilbert's armour, declaring that their business is not concluded. He instructs his attendant, Gurth in disguise, to convey money to Isaac to repay him for arranging the provision of his horse and armour. Gurth does so, but Rebecca secretly refunds the money.

Ch. 11: Gurth is assailed by a band of outlaws, but they spare him on hearing his story and after he has defeated one of their number, a miller, at quarter-staves.

Ch. 12: The Disinherited Knight's party triumph at the tournament, with the aid of a knight in black [Richard in disguise]; he is revealed as Ivanhoe and faints as a result of the wounds he has incurred.

Ch. 13: John encourages De Bracy to court Rowena and receives a warning from France that Richard has escaped. Locksley [Robin Hood] triumphs in an archery contest.

Ch. 14: At the tournament banquet Cedric continues to disown his son (who has been associating with the Normans) but drinks to the health of Richard, rather than John, as the noblest of that race.

=== Volume Two ===
Ch. 1 (15): De Bracy (disguised as a forester) tells Fitzurse of his plan to capture Rowena and then 'rescue' her in his own person.

Ch. 2 (16): The Black Knight is entertained by a hermit [Friar Tuck] at Copmanhurst.

Ch. 3 (17): The Black Knight and the hermit exchange songs.

Ch. 4 (18): (Retrospect: Before going to the banquet Cedric learned that Ivanhoe had been removed by unknown carers; Gurth was recognised and captured by Cedric's cupbearer Oswald.) Cedric finds Athelstane unresponsive to his attempts to interest him in Rowena, who is herself only attracted by Ivanhoe.

Ch. 5 (19): Rowena persuades Cedric to escort Isaac and Rebecca, who have been abandoned (along with a sick man [Ivanhoe] in their care) by their hired protectors. Wamba helps Gurth to escape again. De Bracy mounts his attack, during which Wamba escapes. He meets up with Gurth and they encounter Locksley who, after investigation, advises against a counter-attack, the captives not being in immediate danger.

Ch. 6 (20): Locksley sends two of his men to watch De Bracy. At Copmanhurst he meets the Black Knight who agrees to join in the rescue.

Ch. 7 (21): De Bracy tells Bois-Guilbert he has decided to abandon his 'rescue' plan, mistrusting his companion though the Templar says it is Rebecca he is interested in. On arrival at Torquilstone castle Cedric laments its decline.

Ch. 8 (22): Under threat of torture Isaac agrees to pay Front-de-Bœuf a thousand pounds, but only if Rebecca is released.

Ch. 9 (23): De Bracy uses Ivanhoe's danger from Front-de-Bœuf to put pressure on Rowena, but he is moved by her resulting distress. The narrator refers the reader to historical instances of baronial oppression in medieval England.

Ch. 10 (24): A hag Urfried [Ulrica] warns Rebecca of her forthcoming fate. Rebecca impresses Bois-Guilbert by her spirited resistance to his advances.

Ch. 11 (25): Front-de-Bœuf rejects a written challenge from Gurth and Wamba. Wamba offers to spy out the castle posing as a confessor.

Ch. 12 (26): Entering the castle, Wamba exchanges clothes with Cedric who encounters Rebecca and Urfried.

Ch. 13 (27): Urfried recognises Cedric as a Saxon and, revealing herself as Ulrica, tells her story which involves Front-de-Bœuf murdering his father, who had killed her father and seven brothers when taking the castle, and had become her detested lover. She says she will give a signal when the time is ripe for storming the castle. Front-de-Bœuf sends the presumed friar with a message to summon reinforcements. Athelstane defies him, claiming that Rowena is his fiancée. The monk Ambrose arrives seeking help for Aymer who has been captured by Locksley's men.

Ch. 14 (28): (Retrospective chapter detailing Rebecca's care for Ivanhoe from the tournament to the assault on Torquilstone.)

Ch. 15 (29): Rebecca describes the assault on Torquilstone to the wounded Ivanhoe, disagreeing with his exalted view of chivalry.

Ch. 16 (30): Front-de-Bœuf being mortally wounded, Bois-Guilbert and De Bracy discuss how best to repel the besiegers. Ulrica sets fire to the castle and exults over Front-de-Bœuf who perishes in the flames.

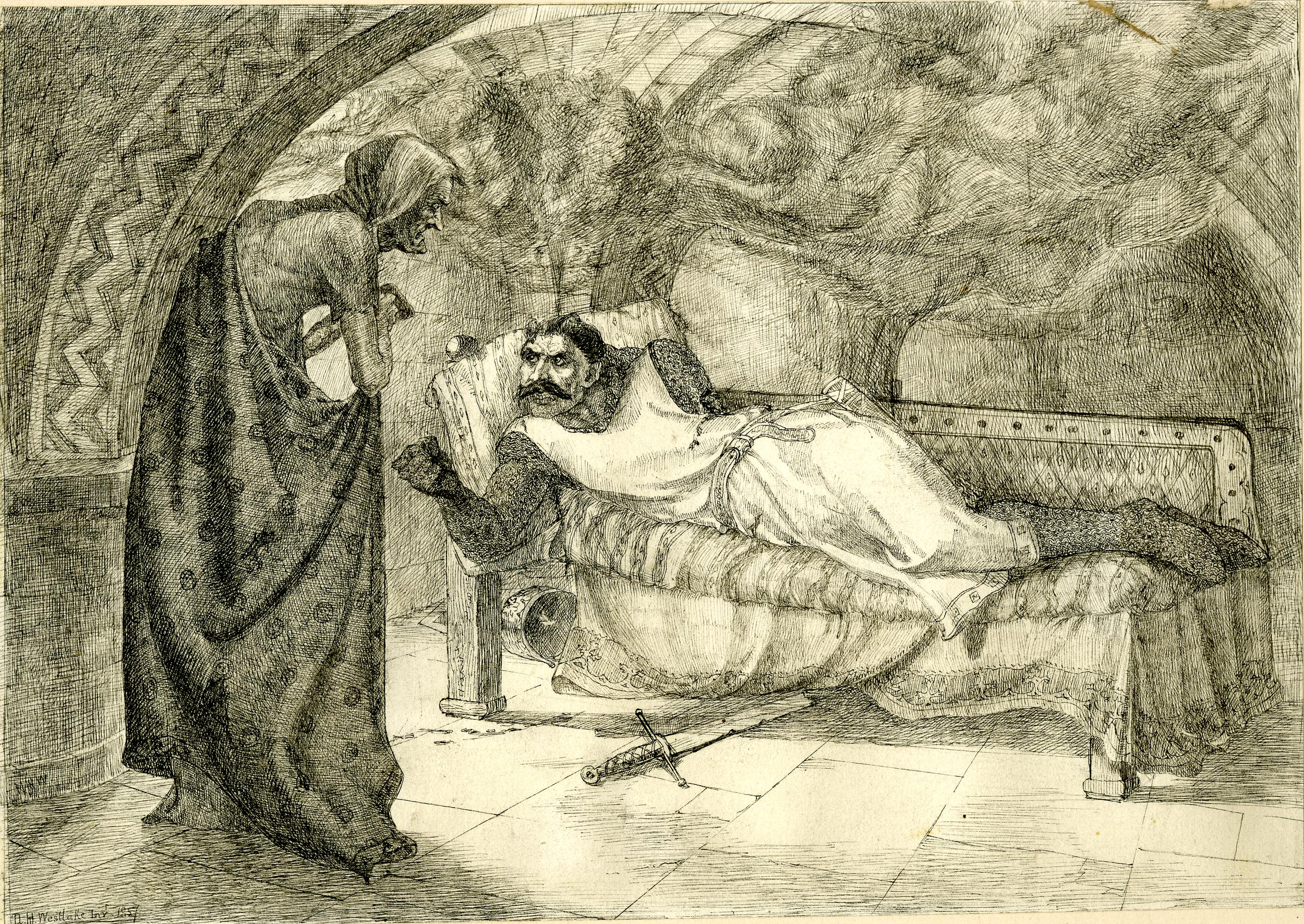
Ulrica and Front-de-Bœuf, illustrated by Nathaniel Westlake (1857)

=== Volume Three ===
Ch. 1 (31): (The chapter opens with a retrospective account of the attackers' plans and the taking of the barbican.) The Black Knight defeats De Bracy, making himself known to him as Richard, and rescues Ivanhoe. Bois-Guilbert rescues Rebecca, striking down Athelstane who thinks she is Rowena. Ulrica perishes in the flames after singing a wild pagan hymn.

Ch. 2 (32): Locksley supervises the orderly division of the spoil. Friar Tuck brings Isaac whom he has made captive, and engages in good-natured buffeting with the Black Knight.

Ch. 3 (33): Locksley arranges ransom terms for Isaac and Aymer. Aymer agrees to write on Isaac's behalf to Bois-Guilbert, to urge Rebecca's release, in exchange for Isaac loaning him money to pay his ransom to the banditti.

Ch. 4 (34): De Bracy informs John that Richard is in England. Together with Fitzurse he threatens to desert John, but the prince responds cunningly.

Ch. 5 (35): At York, Isaac stays with a friend, Nathan, as he strives to rescue Rebecca from the Templestowe. At the priory the Grand-Master Beaumanoir tells Conrade Mountfitchet that he intends to take a hard line with Templar irregularities. Arriving, Isaac shows him a letter from Aymer to Bois-Guilbert referring to Rebecca, whom Beaumanoir determines must be a witch.

Ch. 6 (36): Beaumanoir tells Preceptor Albert Malvoisin of his outrage at Rebecca's presence in the preceptory. Albert informs Bois-Guilbert of her trial for sorcery, and warns Bois-Guilbert not to defend her. Mountfichet says he will seek evidence against her, including bribing a few fake witnesses with fabricated stories.

Ch. 7 (37): Rebecca is found guilty of witchcraft and sentenced to death. At Bois-Guilbert's secret prompting she demands that a champion defend her in trial by combat.

Ch. 8 (38): Rebecca's demand is accepted, Bois-Guilbert being appointed champion for the prosecution. Bearing a message to her father, the peasant Higg meets him and Nathan on their way to the preceptory, and Isaac goes in search of Ivanhoe.

Ch. 9 (39): Rebecca rejects Bois-Guilbert's offer to fail to appear for the combat in return for her love. Albert persuades him that it is in his interest to appear.

Ch. 10 (40): The Black Knight leaves Ivanhoe to travel to Coningsburgh castle for Athelstane's funeral, and Ivanhoe follows him the next day. The Black Knight is rescued by Locksley from an attack carried out by Fitzurse on John's orders, and reveals his identity as Richard to his companions, prompting Locksley to identify himself as Robin Hood.

Ch. 11 (41): Richard talks to Ivanhoe and dines with the outlaws before Robin arranges a false alarm to put an end to the delay. The party arrive at Coningsburgh.

Ch. 12 (42): Richard procures Ivanhoe's pardon from his father. Athelstane appears, not dead, giving his allegiance to Richard and surrendering Rowena to Ivanhoe. Ivanhoe and Richard each receive a message and disappear from Coningsburgh.

Ch. 13 (43): Rebecca is tied to the stake, and no champion appears. Bois-Guilbert, racked by guilt, begs her to run away with him. Rebecca refuses. Ivanhoe, exhausted from his ride and not fully recovered from his injury, appears as Rebecca's champion, and as they charge Bois-Guilbert dies the victim of his contending passions.

Ch. 14 (44): Beaumanoir and his Templars leave Richard defiantly. Cedric agrees to the marriage of Ivanhoe and Rowena. Rebecca takes her leave of Rowena, leaving a message of her thanks to Ivanhoe for saving her, before her father and she quit England to make a new life under the tolerant King of Granada.

== Style ==
Critics of the novel have treated it as a romance intended mainly to entertain boys. Ivanhoe maintains many of the elements of the romance genre, including the quest, a chivalric setting, and the overthrowing of a corrupt social order to bring on a time of happiness. Other critics assert that the novel creates a realistic and vibrant story, idealising neither the past nor its main character.

== Themes ==
Scott treats themes similar to those of some of his earlier novels, like Rob Roy and The Heart of Midlothian, examining the conflict between heroic ideals and modern society. In the latter novels, industrial society becomes the centre of this conflict as the "backward" Scots and the "advanced" English have to arise from chaos to create unity. Similarly, the Normans in Ivanhoe, who represent a more sophisticated culture, and the Saxons, who are poor, disenfranchised, and resentful of Norman rule, band together and begin to mould themselves into one people. The conflict between the Saxons and Normans focuses on the losses both groups must experience before they can be reconciled and thus forge a united England. The particular loss is in the extremes of their own cultural values, which must be disavowed in order for the society to function. For the Saxons, this value is the final admission of the hopelessness of the Saxon cause. The Normans must learn to overcome the materialism and violence in their own codes of chivalry. Ivanhoe and Richard represent the hope of reconciliation for a unified future.

Ivanhoe, though of a more noble lineage than some of the other characters, represents a middling individual in the medieval class system who is not exceptionally outstanding in his abilities, as is expected of other quasi-historical fictional characters, such as the Greek heroes. Critic György Lukács points to middling main characters like Ivanhoe in Walter Scott's other novels as one of the primary reasons Scott's historical novels depart from previous historical works, and better explore social and cultural history.

== Allusions to real history and geography ==
The location of the novel is centred upon southern Yorkshire, north-west Leicestershire and northern Nottinghamshire in England. Castles mentioned within the story include Ashby de la Zouch Castle (now a ruin in the care of English Heritage), York (though the mention of Clifford's Tower, likewise an extant English Heritage property, is anachronistic, it not having been called that until later after various rebuilds) and 'Coningsburgh', which is based upon Conisbrough Castle, in the ancient town of Conisbrough near Doncaster (the castle also being a popular English Heritage site). In the novel, Aymer is the Prior of Jorvaulx, a historical spelling of the great Jervaulx Abbey of Yorkshire. Reference is made within the story to York Minster, where the climactic wedding takes place, and to the Bishop of Sheffield, although the Diocese of Sheffield did not exist at either the time of the novel or the time Scott wrote the novel and was not founded until 1914. Such references suggest that Robin Hood lived or travelled in the region.

Conisbrough is so dedicated to the story of Ivanhoe that many of its streets, schools, and public buildings are named after characters from the book.

Sir Walter Scott took the title of his novel, the name of its hero, from the Buckinghamshire village of Ivinghoe. "The name of Ivanhoe," he says in his 1830 Introduction to the Magnum edition, "was suggested by an old rhyme.

Tring, Wing, and Ivanhoe,

For striking of a blow,

Hampden did forego,

And glad he could escape so.

Ivanhoe is an alternate name for Ivinghoe first recorded in 1665.

Older rural people in the Ivinghoe area most probably pronounced the name the same as Ivanhoe, according to Prof. Paul Kerswill of the University of York, a Fellow of the British Academy (FBA).

It is most probable Scott had direct knowledge of Ivinghoe and did some research before using it as the title for his novel, as he did for the other places mentioned in the novel.

The presence of Sir Walter Scott was recorded in Berkhamsted that is just eight miles away from Ivinghoe. In the novel he speaks also of "the rich fief of Ivanhoe". The Manor of Ivanhoe is listed in the largest 20% of settlements recorded in Domesday.

=== Lasting influence on the Robin Hood legend ===
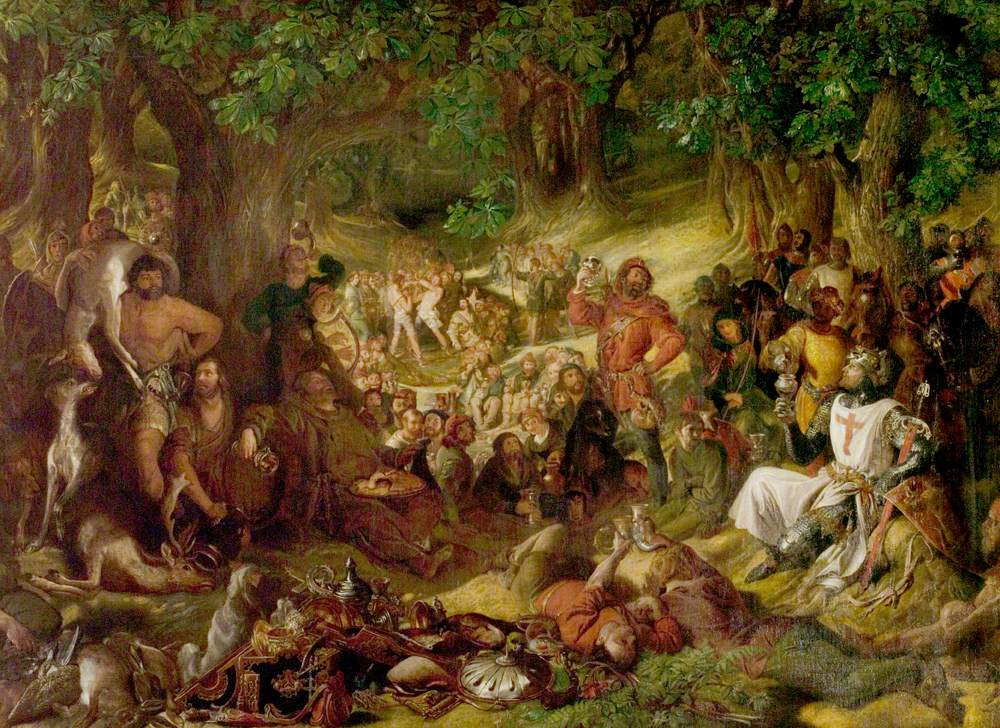
Robin Hood and His Merry Men Entertaining Richard the Lionheart in Sherwood Forest, an 1839 painting by Daniel Maclise inspired by the novel

The modern conception of Robin Hood as a cheerful, decent, patriotic rebel owes much to Ivanhoe.

"Locksley" becomes Robin Hood's title in the Scott novel, and it has been used ever since to refer to the legendary outlaw. Scott appears to have taken the name from an anonymous manuscript—written in 1600—that employs "Locksley" as an epithet for Robin Hood. Owing to Scott's decision to make use of the manuscript, Robin Hood from Locksley has been transformed for all time into "Robin of Locksley", alias Robin Hood. (There is, incidentally, a village called Loxley in Sheffield, Yorkshire.)

Scott makes the 12th-century's Saxon-Norman conflict a major theme in his novel. The original medieval stories about Robin Hood did not mention any conflict between Saxons and Normans; it was Scott who introduced this theme into the legend. The characters in Ivanhoe refer to Prince John and King Richard I as "Normans"; contemporary medieval documents from this period do not refer to either of these two rulers as Normans. Recent re-tellings of the story retain Scott's emphasis on the Norman-Saxon conflict.

Scott also shunned the late-16th-century depiction of Robin as a dispossessed nobleman (the Earl of Huntingdon).

This, however, has not prevented Scott from making an important contribution to the noble-hero strand of the legend, too, because some subsequent motion picture treatments of Robin Hood's adventures give Robin traits that are characteristic of Ivanhoe as well. The most notable Robin Hood films are the lavish Douglas Fairbanks 1922 silent film, the 1938 triple Academy Award-winning Adventures of Robin Hood with Errol Flynn as Robin (which contemporary reviewer Frank Nugent links specifically with Ivanhoe), and the 1991 box-office success Robin Hood: Prince of Thieves with Kevin Costner. There is also the Mel Brooks spoof Robin Hood: Men in Tights.

In most versions of Robin Hood, both Ivanhoe and Robin, for instance, are returning Crusaders. They have quarrelled with their respective fathers, they are proud to be Saxons, they display a highly evolved sense of justice, they support the rightful king even though he is of Norman-French ancestry, they are adept with weapons, and they each fall in love with a "fair maid" (Rowena and Marian, respectively).

This particular time-frame was popularised by Scott. He borrowed it from the writings of the 16th-century chronicler John Mair or a 17th-century ballad presumably to make the plot of his novel more gripping. Medieval balladeers had generally placed Robin about two centuries later in the reign of Edward I, II or III.

Robin's familiar feat of splitting his competitor's arrow in an archery contest appears for the first time in Ivanhoe.

=== Historical accuracy ===
The general political events depicted in the novel are fairly accurate; the novel tells of the period just after King Richard's imprisonment in Austria following the Crusade and of his return to England after a ransom is paid. Yet the story is also heavily fictionalised. Scott himself acknowledged that he had taken liberties with history in his "Dedicatory Epistle" to Ivanhoe. Modern readers are cautioned to understand that Scott's aim was to create a compelling novel set in a historical period, not to provide a book of history.

There has been criticism of Scott's portrayal of the bitter extent of the "enmity of Saxon and Norman, represented as persisting in the days of Richard" as "unsupported by the evidence of contemporary records that forms the basis of the story." Historian E. A. Freeman criticised Scott's novel, stating its depiction of a Saxon–Norman conflict in late twelfth-century England was unhistorical. Freeman cited medieval writer Walter Map, who claimed that tension between the Saxons and Normans had declined by the reign of Henry I. Freeman also cited the late twelfth-century book Dialogus de Scaccario by Richard FitzNeal. This book claimed that the Saxons and Normans had so merged through intermarriage and cultural assimilation that (outside the aristocracy) it was impossible to tell "one from the other." Finally, Freeman ended his critique of Scott by saying that by the end of the twelfth century, the descendants of both Saxons and Normans in England referred to themselves as "English", not "Saxon" or "Norman".

However, Scott may have intended to suggest parallels between the Norman Conquest, which takes place roughly 130 years before the setting of Ivanhoe, and Scott's native Scotland, which had united with England in 1707 roughly the same length of time ago, and witnessed a resurgence in Scottish nationalism evidenced by the emergence of Robert Burns, the famous poet who deliberately chose to work in Scots vernacular though he was an educated man and spoke modern English eloquently. Some experts suggest that Scott deliberately used Ivanhoe to illustrate his own combination of Scottish patriotism and unionism.

The novel generated a new name in English—Cedric. The original Saxon name had been Cerdic but Scott misspelled it—an example of metathesis.

In England in 1194, it would have been anachronistic for Rebecca, a Jewish woman, to be charged with witchcraft. In medieval witch trials, it was usually the belief in witchcraft that was prosecuted as a heresy, a charge a non-Christian woman would not have been subject to. Death did not become the usual penalty until the 15th century and even then, the form of execution used for witches in England was hanging, not burning. The conductor of the trial, the Grand Master Of The Templars, is referred to as Lucas de Beaumanoir, whereas the historically real Master during that time was Gilbert Horal. There are other various minor errors, e.g. the description of the tournament at Ashby owes more to the 14th century, most of the coins mentioned by Scott are exotic, William Rufus is said to have been John Lackland's grandfather, but he was actually his great-great-uncle, and Wamba (disguised as a monk) says "I am a poor brother of the Order of St Francis", but St. Francis of Assisi only began his preaching ten years after the death of Richard I. Also, in Chapter 43, Bois-Guilbert commences the fight being mounted on his horse named Zamor, which he claimed that he had won from the "Soldan of Trebizond". This is anachronistic, as the Comnenids founded that rump state only in 1204, just by the end of the Fourth Crusade. Lastly, in the novel's ultimate chapter, Rebecca and her father move to Granada to spend the rest of their lives under Mohammed Boabdil. In fact, the real Muhammad XI of Granada, popularly known to the Western world as Boabdil, was not even born before 1460, and the Emirate of Granada established before 1230.

Despite this fancifulness, Ivanhoe does make some prescient historical points. The novel is occasionally critical of King Richard, "who seems to love adventure more than he loves the well-being of his subjects"—in contrast to the idealised, romantic view of Richard popular at the time, but rather echoes the way King Richard is often judged by historians today.

== Reception ==
Most of the original reviewers gave Ivanhoe an enthusiastic or broadly favourable reception. As usual, Scott's descriptive powers and his ability to present the matters of the past were generally praised. More than one reviewer found the work notably poetic. Several of them found themselves transported imaginatively to the remote period of the novel, although some problems were recognised: the combining of features from the high and late Middle Ages; an awkwardly created language for the dialogue; and antiquarian overload. The author's excursion into England was generally judged a success, the forest outlaws and the creation of 'merry England' attracting particular praise. Rebecca was almost unanimously admired, especially in her farewell scene. The plot was either criticised for its weakness, or just regarded as of less importance than the scenes and characters. The scenes at Torquilstone were judged horrible by several critics, with special focus on Ulrica. Athelstane's resurrection found no favour, the kindest response being that of Francis Jeffrey in The Edinburgh Review who suggested (writing anonymously, like all the reviewers) that it was 'introduced out of the very wantonness of merriment'.

Letitia Elizabeth Landon, who was a devotee of Scott's, wrote a poetical illustration to a picture of The Tournament. by Thomas Allom in Fisher's Drawing Room Scrap Book, 1838.

The Eglinton Tournament of 1839 held by the 13th Earl of Eglinton at Eglinton Castle in Ayrshire was inspired by and modelled on Ivanhoe.

On 5 November 2019, BBC Arts included Ivanhoe on its list of the 100 most influential novels.

== Sequels ==
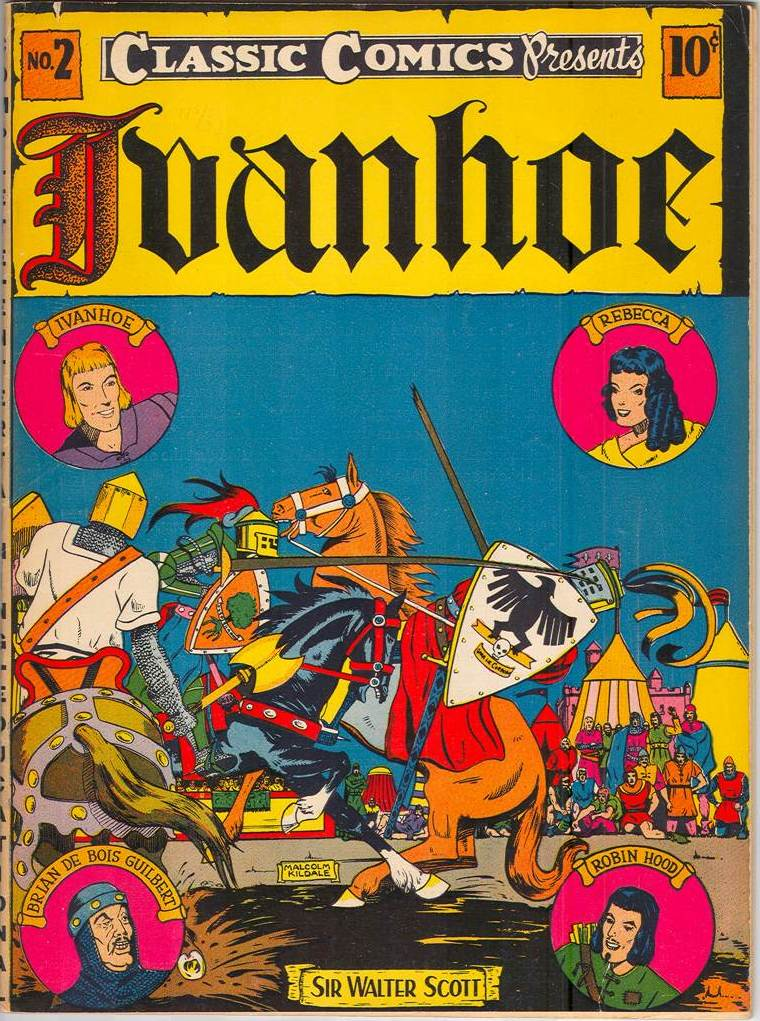
Classic Comics issue #2

- In 1850, novelist William Makepeace Thackeray wrote a spoof sequel to Ivanhoe called Rebecca and Rowena.
- Edward Eager's book Knight's Castle (1956) magically transports four children into the story of Ivanhoe.
- Simon Hawke uses the story as the basis for The Ivanhoe Gambit (1984) the first novel in his time travel adventure series TimeWars.
- Pierre Efratas wrote a sequel called Le Destin d'Ivanhoe (2003), published by Éditions Charles Corlet.
- Christopher Vogler wrote a sequel called Ravenskull (2006), published by Seven Seas Publishing.

== References in other literature ==
- Jack and Jill by Louisa May Alcott (1880). When feeling sorry for her current lot in life, Merry looked at the copy of Ivanhoe and thought of Rebecca, "Sweeping, baking, and darning are not so bad as being plagued with lovers and carried off and burnt at the stake, so I won't envy poor Rebecca her jewels and curls and romantic times, but make the best of my own."
- The Heart is a Lonely Hunter by Carson McCullers (1940). Harry Minowitz, a Jewish adolescent, feels alienated when his high school class reads Ivanhoe, "...at Vocational when they read about the Jew in 'Ivanhoe' the other kids would look around at Harry and he would come home and cry."
- To Kill a Mockingbird by Harper Lee (1960). When Jem destroys Mrs. Dubose's camellias, Jem is forced to read Ivanhoe to her as a punishment.

== Film, TV or theatrical adaptations ==
=== Films ===
The novel has been the basis for several motion pictures:

- Ivanhoe, United States 1911, directed by J. Stuart Blackton
- Ivanhoe, United States 1913, directed by Herbert Brenon; with King Baggot, Leah Baird, and Brenon. Filmed on location in England
- Ivanhoe, Wales 1913, directed by Leedham Bantock, filmed at Chepstow Castle
- Ye Olden Days, United States 1933, directed by Burt Gillett
- Ivanhoe, 1952, directed by Richard Thorpe, starring Robert Taylor, Elizabeth Taylor, Joan Fontaine and George Sanders; nominated for three Oscars.
- The Revenge of Ivanhoe (1965) starred Rik Van Nutter (an Italian peplum)
- Ivanhoe, the Norman Swordsman (1971) aka La spada normanna, directed by Roberto Mauri (an Italian peplum)
- The Ballad of the Valiant Knight Ivanhoe (Баллада о доблестном рыцаре Айвенго), USSR 1983, directed by Sergey Tarasov, with songs of Vladimir Vysotsky, starring Peteris Gaudins as Ivanhoe.

=== Television ===
There have also been many television adaptations of the novel, including:

- 1958: A television series based on the character of Ivanhoe starring Roger Moore as Ivanhoe
- 1970: A TV miniseries starring Eric Flynn as Ivanhoe
- 1975: Children's Animated Classics Ivanhoe
- 1982: Ivanhoe, a television movie starring Anthony Andrews as Ivanhoe
- 1986: Ivanhoe, a 1986 animated telemovie produced by Burbank Films in Australia
- 1995: Young Ivanhoe, a 1995 television movie directed by Ralph L. Thomas and starring Kristen Holden-Ried as Ivanhoe, Rachel Blanchard as Rowena, Stacy Keach as Pembrooke, Margot Kidder as Lady Margarite, Nick Mancuso as Bourget, and Matthew Daniels as Tuck
- 1995: "Sniffing the Gauntlet", an episode of the PBS show Wishbone that featured a retelling of Ivanhoe. A book tie-in was later published as Wishbone Classics #12: Ivanhoe, The Adventures of Wishbone #20: Ivanhound.
- 1997: Ivanhoe the King's Knight a televised cartoon series produced by CINAR and France Animation. General retelling of classic tale.
- 1997: Ivanhoe, a 6-part, 5-hour TV miniseries, a co-production of A&E and the BBC. It stars Steven Waddington as Ivanhoe, Ciarán Hinds as Bois-Guilbert, Susan Lynch as Rebecca, Ralph Brown as Prince John and Victoria Smurfit as Rowena
- 1999: The Legend of Ivanhoe, a Columbia TriStar International Television production dubbed into English starring John Haverson as Ivanhoe and Rita Shaver as Rowena
- 2000–2002: Dark Knight, a New Zealand/British series, starring Ben Pullen as Ivanhoe and Charlotte Comer as Rebecca
- 2017: The Heroic Quest of the Valiant Prince Ivandoe, a Danish/British animated parody.

=== Operas ===
Victor Sieg's dramatic cantata Ivanhoé won the Prix de Rome in 1864 and premiered in Paris the same year. Ivanhoe was the grand opera by Arthur Sullivan and Julian Sturgis (Sturgis was recommended by Sullivan's oft-time partner W. S. Gilbert). It debuted in 1891, and ran for 155 consecutive performances. Other operas based on the novel have been composed by Gioachino Rossini (Ivanhoé), Thomas Sari (Ivanhoé), Bartolomeo Pisani (Rebecca), A. Castagnier (Rébecca), Otto Nicolai (Il Templario), and Heinrich Marschner (Der Templer und die Jüdin). Rossini's opera is a pasticcio (an opera in which the music for a new text is chosen from pre-existent music by one or more composers). Scott attended a performance of it and recorded in his journal, "It was an opera, and, of course, the story sadly mangled and the dialogue, in part nonsense."

== Legacy ==
The railway running through Ashby-de-la-Zouch was known as the Ivanhoe line between 1993 and 2005, in reference to the book's setting in the locality.

A portion of the Silver Lake neighborhood in Los Angeles was established in 1887 as a real estate tract called Ivanhoe. (Realtors John C. Byram and Robert W. Poindexter were behind the tract; it is a myth that it was named decades earlier by Scottish settler Hugo Reid, as he never lived in this section of Los Angeles County.) The upper reservoir and an elementary school are still named Ivanhoe while many of the streets in the area reference Scott's other works and characters such as Locksley, Rowena, Kenilworth, Waverly [sic], Avenel, and St. George.

Ivanhoe, North Carolina is named after Ivanhoe.

== See also ==
- Norman yoke
- Trysting Tree – several references are made to these trees as agreed gathering places.
