= Young Ivanhoe =

1995 film by Ralph L. Thomas

Young Ivanhoe is a 1995 romantic adventure TV movie based on the 1819 novel by Sir Walter Scott. It was directed by Ralph L. Thomas and starred Kristen Holden-Ried as Ivanhoe. Other starring actors were Stacy Keach, Margot Kidder, Nick Mancuso, Rachel Blanchard, and Matthew Daniels.
