= Rebecca and the Wounded Ivanhoe =

Painting by Eugène Delacroix

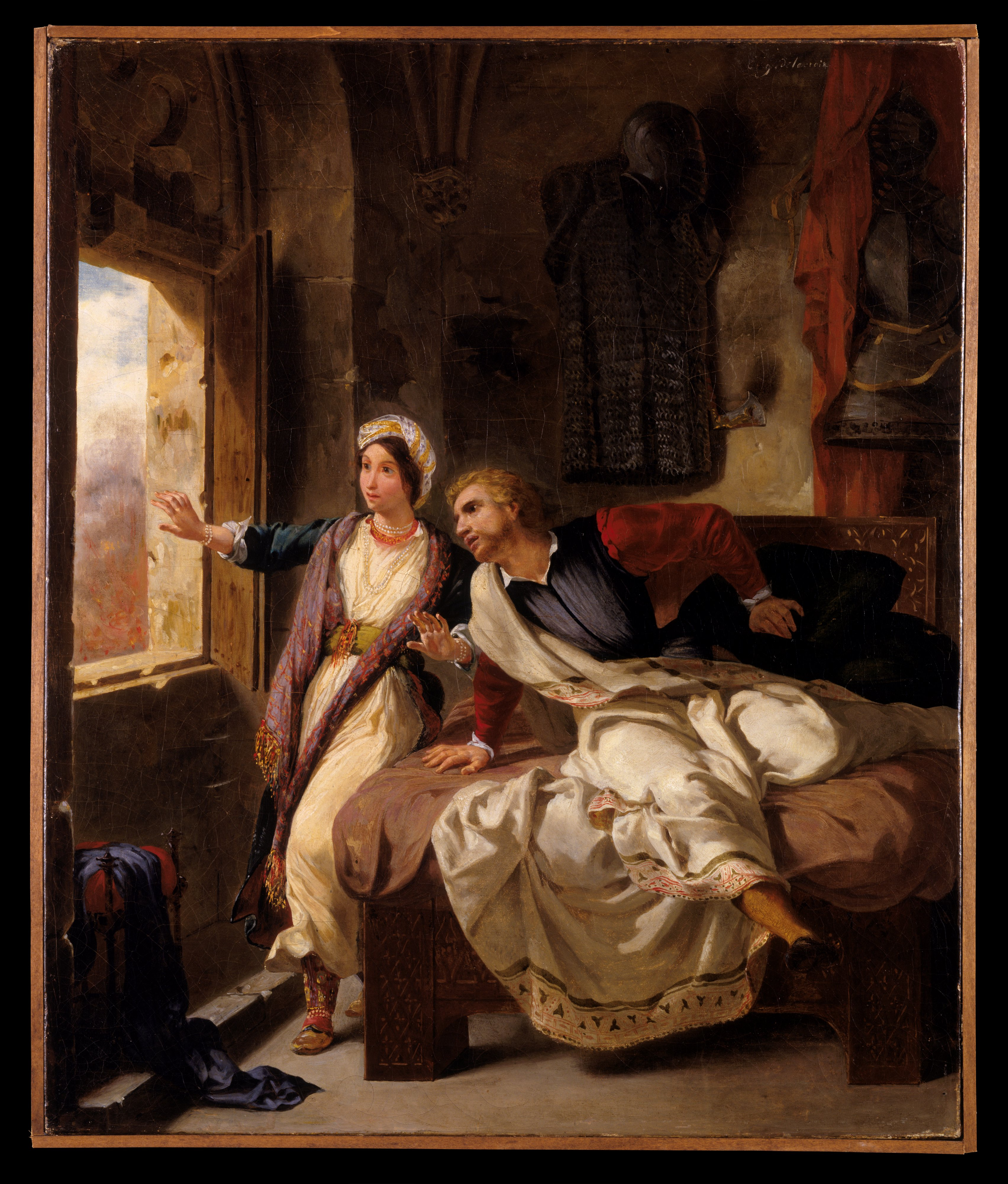
- Artist: Eugène Delacroix
- Year: 1823
- Type: Oil on canvas, genre painting
- Dimensions: 64.5 cm × 53.7 cm (25.4 in × 21.1 in)
- Location: Metropolitan Museum of Art; New York City

Rebecca and the Wounded Ivanhoe is an 1823 oil painting by the French artist Eugène Delacroix. It features a scene from the 1819 novel Ivanhoe by the British writer Walter Scott. Based on Chapter 29, it features a wounded Ivanhoe straining to get out of his sickbed while Rebecca describes the raging battle outside to him. The two are imprisoned at the time in the castle of Torquilstone.

Delacroix was a leading figure of the Romantic movement, known for The Barque of Dante and the later Liberty Leading the People. This was his first attempt to depict a subject based on Scott, a popular inspiration for French romantics along with Lord Byron and William Shakespeare. Today the painting is in the collection of the Metropolitan Museum of Art in New York City, which acquired it in 2019.

== Bibliography ==
- Allard, Sébastien & Fabre, Côme. Delacroix. Metropolitan Museum of Art, 2018.
- Alston, Isabella. Delacroix. TAJ Books International, 2014.
- Johnson, Lee. The Paintings of Eugène Delacroix: A Critical Catalogue, 1816-1831, Volume 3. Clarendon Press, 1981.
