= Camelia Frieberg =

Canadian film producer and director

Camelia Frieberg (born 1959) is a Canadian film producer and director. She is a two-time winner of the Genie Award for Best Picture, as producer of Atom Egoyan's films Exotica and The Sweet Hereafter.

== Career ==
Originally from Toronto, she studied ethnomusicology at Bennington College in Vermont. Returning to Toronto after her graduation, she wrote film reviews for various Toronto publications until taking a job as second assistant director on Charles Burnett's 1983 film My Brother's Wedding. She then became a production manager on Egoyan's Next of Kin, working her way up to production on his later films Speaking Parts and The Adjuster.

She also produced Jeremy Podeswa's films Eclipse and The Five Senses, Daniel MacIvor's Wilby Wonderful and Amnon Buchbinder's The Fishing Trip and Whole New Thing, and was an executive producer of Deepa Mehta's Bollywood/Hollywood.

== Direction ==
In 1988, Frieberg directed the documentary film Crossing the River, a profile of a Salvadoran refugee living in Canada. In 2006, she made her debut as a feature film director, with the film A Stone's Throw.

She subsequently launched The Pollination Project, an environmentally sustainable creative retreat centre near Bridgewater, Nova Scotia.
