= A Stone's Throw =

- Directed by: Camelia Frieberg
- Written by: Camelia Frieberg Garfield Lindsay Miller
- Produced by: Kelly Bray
- Starring: Kris Holden-Ried; Kathryn MacLellan; Lisa Ray; Hugh Thompson; Aaron Webber
- Cinematography: Christopher Ball
- Edited by: Thorben Bieger
- Music by: David Buchbinder
- Production company: THINKFilm Palpable Productions Acuity Pictures Productions
- Distributed by: THINKFilm
- Release date: 13 September 2006
- Running time: 98 minutes
- Country: Canada
- Language: English

A Stone's Throw is a 2006 Canadian drama film written by Camelia Frieberg and Garfield Lindsay Miller, directed by Camelia Frieberg, and starring Kris Holden-Ried, Kathryn MacLellan, Aaron Webber, and Lisa Ray.

The film tells the story of Jack Walker, a photojournalist whose life is devoted to uncovering harm done to the environment by industrial corporations, and his struggles to balance his family, his love life, and his activism. The film's subject matter is deeply involved with environmentalism, the ways in which the manufacturing industry exploits nature in order to make a profit, and environmental terrorism. Frieberg stated in an interview that the film's title refers to the conveniences of the modern world, and the trade-offs involved with having everything just a stone's throw away.

A Stone's Throw marks the directorial debut of Camelia Frieberg, previously known for her producing work on films such as Exotica, and The Sweet Hereafter. Frieberg stated that she was inspired to write a film based on the premise that "there's very little in society that allows you to understand that each of your actions has a consequence ... on the planet, on other people, and on other species." The film was shot in and around Frieberg's home in Halifax, Nova Scotia over the course of 15 days. At the 2006 Atlantic Film Festival it was awarded best Atlantic feature, and best sound design. The film received mixed reviews.

== Plot ==
Photojournalist Jack Walker arrives at the Nova Scotia home of his long-estranged sister Olivia, the siblings discuss what has happened in their lives over the 8-year period since they last saw each other, such as Olivia's divorce from her husband Jean Marc. Jack and Olivia go and meet with Olivia's friend Lia, the local kindergarten teacher, and Jack expresses an interest in a factory in the town. Jack then goes to pick up Olivia's son Thomas from his father Jean Marc's house, and the two discuss Jack's work.

Later, Jack reveals to Olivia that he has retinitis pigmentosa, a genetic degenerative eye disease. Jack says that it runs in their family, and that Olivia should get Thomas tested as well. He then says that the disease is the reason he had to quit his job, saying that he came to Nova Scotia so that Thomas could be tested as well. The two argue as to whether or not Thomas should be tested, as the disease has no cure. The argument devolves as Olivia asks why Jack missed their father's funeral, and Jack calls their father a murderer and walks away, saying he should go.

After going on a hike the next morning with Lia, Jack makes up with Olivia. Thomas tells Jack that he believes that pollution from the factory is making his sisters asthma worse, Jack encourages Thomas to look into this theory. Thomas then asks his father if he knows anything about workers getting sick from harmful chemicals at the factory, Jean Marc, who works at the factory reacts angrily, saying that the factory is the first steady employment the town has seen in a while, and that a large part of the community works there.

The next day, Jack helps out with the kindergarten class play, playing the piano as Lia directs. Afterwards, the two have sex. Later, Thomas then hears a knock on the door and goes downstairs, but before he can answer it Jack insists that Thomas not tell the person that he is there. Thomas opens the door and finds a police officer, who asks if he has heard from his uncle Jack lately, Thomas lies and the officer leaves. Jack reassures Thomas that the issue is just surrounding an unpaid parking ticket. Thomas then searches for his uncle's name on the internet, finding an FBI posting for Jack, stating that he is wanted for damaging and destroying industrial buildings at a mine in the United States with improvised explosives. Thomas then confronts Jack, saying that the internet is calling him an eco-terrorist, Jack responds by saying that the mining companies that use controversial mining techniques such as gold cyanidation are the real terrorists.

Jack then reveals to Lia that he burned down the mine's office, and that his losing his sight to his disease motivated his crime, as he can no longer do his job, and he wants to be able to make a change before it's too late. Olivia discovers what Jack did at the mine, which turns out once belonged to their father, and kicks him out of her house. Jack goes to stay with Lia.

Thomas, who has become obsessed with uncovering the extent of the pollution caused by the factory goes and trespasses onto the factory property and is subsequently arrested. After finding out about this, Jean Marc comes and threatens Jack, telling him to watch himself. Jack then sees Thomas stealing his truck, driving it to the factory, Jack and Olivia chase after him in Olivia's car. The chase ends abruptly as Thomas crashes Jack's truck into a deer. This causes Jack to come to the realization that what he has done is negatively affecting his family. The movie then ends with Jack and Lia confessing their love to each other as Jack walks into the police station to turn himself in.

== Cast ==
- Kris Holden-Ried as Jack Walker
- Kathryn MacLellan as Olivia
- Aaron Webber as Thomas
- Sarah Lantz as Sarah
- Lisa Ray as Lia
- Alexandra McCorriston as Willa
- Hugh Thompson as Jean Marc
- Brian Heighton as Officer Ted
- Mary-Colin Chisholm as Optometrist
- Chaz Thorne as Editor
- Liam Britten as Jacob
- Peter Doane as Esau
- Robin Moir as Angel
- Bailey Maughan as Messenger

== Release ==
=== Critical reception ===
Reviews for A Stone's Throw were mixed. While the film's cinematography and message of environmental conscientiousness was praised, it was criticized for a lack of focus and character depth. Peter Howell of the Toronto Star described the screenplay as "bordering on preposterous", and criticized a "confused" musical score, while praising the film's performances and for presenting a positive environmental message outside of a documentary.

== Accolades ==
At the 2006 Atlantic Film Festival, A Stone's Throw received the Best Atlantic Feature prize, and the Best Sound Design prize.
