= Whole New Thing =

- Directed by: Amnon Buchbinder
- Written by: Daniel MacIvor; Amnon Buchbinder
- Produced by: Camelia Frieberg
- Starring: Aaron Webber; Daniel MacIvor; Robert Joy; Rebecca Jenkins; Callum Keith Rennie; Kathryn MacLellan
- Cinematography: Christopher Ball
- Edited by: Angela Baker
- Music by: David Buchbinder
- Production companies: Acuity Pictures Production; Palpable Productions
- Distributed by: THINKfilm
- Release date: September 12, 2005 (TIFF)
- Running time: 92 minutes
- Country: Canada
- Language: English

Whole New Thing is a 2005 Canadian drama film directed by Amnon Buchbinder. The film is a coming-of-age narrative about a 13-year-old boy, Emerson Thorsen (played by Aaron Webber) who lives in an isolated straw-bale house with his counter-cultural parents, Rog (Robert Joy) and Kaya (Rebecca Jenkins). However, when Kaya decides that homeschooling provides too little structure for Emerson, she enrolls him at the local middle-school under the tuition of 43-year-old Don Grant (Daniel MacIvor). Emerson, despite displaying a developed intellectual approach to sexuality, discovers the problems that come with developing a crush, and the taboo of this crush being his male teacher.

== Production ==
The script was co-written by Buchbinder and Daniel MacIvor, and was filmed entirely on location in Mahone Bay and Halifax, Nova Scotia, during winter and over the course of 15 days.

The film soundtrack is scored by David Buchbinder, and contains songs by The Hidden Cameras.

The film is distributed by THINKFilm and co-funded by the NSFDC.

== Awards ==
Robert Joy received a Genie Award nomination for Best Supporting Actor at the 27th Genie Awards.
