= David Buchbinder (musician) =

Canadian-American trumpeter, composer, producer, and artistic director

David Buchbinder is a Canadian-American trumpeter, composer, producer, and multidisciplinary performance creator whose work spans jazz, klezmer, and cross-cultural music projects. He has led ensembles including the Flying Bulgar Klezmer Band and David Buchbinder’s Odessa/Havana. His discography spans from about 1999 to 2017.

== Early life and education ==
According to The Canadian Encyclopedia, Buchbinder holds dual citizenship, grew up in St. Louis, and moved to Toronto as a child. His musical training included private study in trumpet technique and jazz improvisation with teachers in Toronto and New York City.

He is the brother of filmmaker Amnon Buchbinder (19582019).

== Career ==
=== Ensembles and recordings ===
Buchbinder founded the Flying Bulgar Klezmer Band in Toronto and served as its bandleader; the ensemble became associated with the revival and reinterpretation of klezmer music in Canada and performed internationally.

He later formed and led David Buchbinder’s Odessa/Havana, a project connecting Jewish musical traditions with Afro-Cuban music. A profile of Buchbinder and the project appeared in DownBeat (March 2014).

=== Festivals, artistic direction, and multidisciplinary performance ===
Buchbinder helped found Toronto’s Ashkenaz Festival and served as its founding artistic director at Harbourfront Centre, helping establish the festival’s artistic vision.

He was the 2016 recipient of the William Kilbourn Award (Toronto Arts Awards). The Toronto Arts Foundation profile also describes him as an inaugural Resident Artist at the Young Centre for the Performing Arts, as well as the founder of Diasporic Genius and artistic director of major music initiatives including the New Canadian Global Music Orchestra (KUNÉ).

== Composition and production ==
Buchbinder composes for his ensembles and has written music for film and television.

=== Film and television ===
His screen work includes original music for films directed by Saul Rubinek, including Jerry and Tom (1998), Club Land (2001), and Bleacher Bums (2002).

He also composed the score for the animated short The Stone of Folly (directed by Jesse Rosensweet). The film received a Prix du Jury at an international film festival, and Buchbinder was recognized at the ASIFA-East Animation Awards for excellence in soundtrack composition.

== Published writing ==
Buchbinder’s writing appears in the anthology What We Talk About When We Talk About Dumplings (Coach House Books). He also contributed an opinion article to the Toronto Star.

== Selected discography ==
David Buchbinder

- Shurum Burum Jazz Circus (2005)

David Buchbinder’s Odessa/Havana

- Odessa/Havana (2007)
- Walk to the Sea (2013)
- Conversation of the Birds (2017)

Nomadica

- Dance of the Infidels (2015)

Flying Bulgar Klezmer Band

- Agada: Tales from Our Ancestors (1993)
- Tsirkus (1999)
- Sweet Return (2003)
- Tumbling Into Light (2009)

== Awards and recognition ==
Buchbinder and David Buchbinder's Odessa/Havana won the JUNO Award for World Music Album of the Year in 2014 for Walk to the Sea.

The Flying Bulgar Klezmer Band was nominated for a JUNO Award in the World Beat category in 1992.

The Canadian Encyclopedia notes that David Buchbinder's Odessa/Havana were named the Canadian Folk Music Award's World Group of the Year (2008).

At the 9th Canadian Folk Music Awards (2013), David Buchbinder & Odessa/Havana (Walk to the Sea) were nominated for World Group of the Year.

Buchbinder received the William Kilbourn Award (Toronto Arts Awards) in 2016.

He was named a finalist for the Premier's Awards for Excellence in the Arts (2016, Music).

Buchbinder was a contributor to Yiddish Glory, which was nominated for a Grammy Award.
