= Kateřina Nedbálková =

Czech sociologist

- Born: 28 May 1974 (age 52)
- Education: Masaryk University
- Occupation: sociologist

Kateřina Nedbálková (born 28 May 1974) is a Czech sociologist and university lecturer. She works at the Faculty of Social Studies at Masaryk University in Brno. She deals with issues of gender, prisons and social class classification.

== Life ==
Kateřina Nedbálková was born on 28 May 1974. In 1998, she received a master's degree in sociology from Masaryk University. Her thesis dealt with homosexual subculture. In 2004, she completed her postgraduate studies and received her PhDr. and Ph.D. degrees. The topic of her dissertation was "Spoutaná Rozkoš aneb reprodukce genderové struktury a heteronormativity ve vězeňských subkulturách žen" ("Shackled Pleasure or the reproduction of gender structure and heteronormativity in women's prison subcultures"), which she subsequently published in book form. She also studied in the United States and Canada. In 2010 she received her habilitation and the title of docent.

In 2004, she joined the Department of Sociology at the Faculty of Social Sciences of the Masaryk University, where she was Head of Gender Studies from 2010 to 2015. She specializes in the sociology of inequality and class, the sociology of family, intimacy and sexuality, also the study of criminality, normality and deviance, and has researched the issue of women in prison. She also dealt with the topic of working-class families.

She supports same-sex marriage.

== Bibliography (selection) ==
- Nedbálková, Kateřina (2006). Spoutaná Rozkoš: (re)produkce genderu a sexuality v ženské věznici (in Czech). Prague: SLON. p. 189. ISBN 80-86429-65-2.
- Nedbálková, Kateřina (2011). Matky kuráže: Lesbické rodiny v pozdně moderní společnosti (in Czech). Prague: SLON. p. 120. ISBN 978-80-7419-041-4.
- Nedbálková, Kateřina (2021). Tichá dřina: Dělnictví a třída v továrně Baťa (in Czech). Prague: Display. ISBN 978-80-907883-1-2.
- Nedbálková, Kateřina (2022). Pracovat (in Czech). Prague: Display. ISBN 978-80-907883-8-1.
