= Kris Holden-Ried =

Canadian actor (b. 1973)

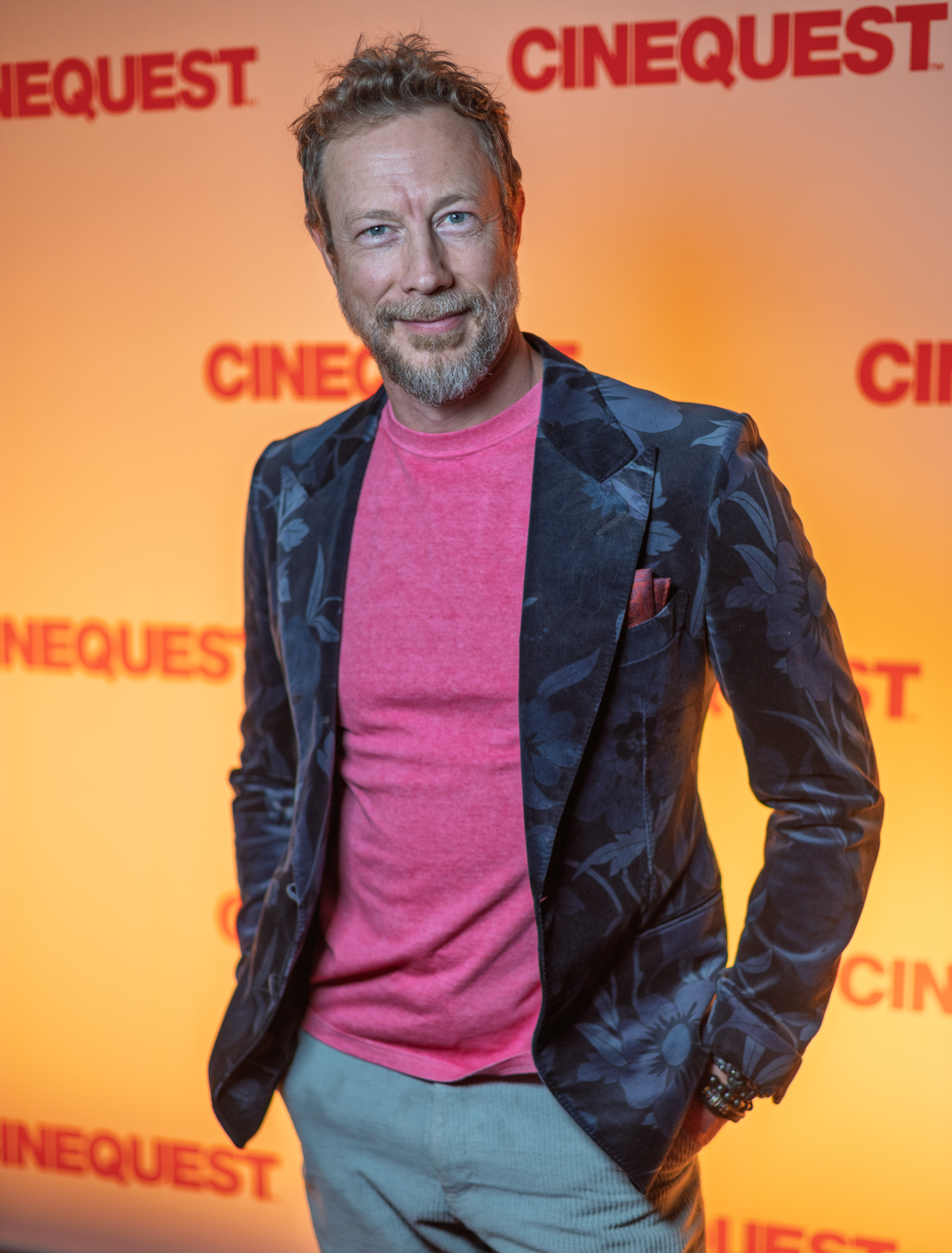
- Holden-Ried at the Cinequest Film Festival in 2026
- Born: August 1, 1973 (age 53); Pickering, Ontario, Canada
- Occupation: Actor
- Years active: 1995–present
- Children: 1

Kris Holden-Ried (born August 1, 1973) is a Canadian actor.

== Early life and pentathlon ==
Holden-Ried was born in Pickering, Ontario. He studied at Montreal's Concordia University School of Business. He was a champion competitor in riding and fencing, and is a former member of the Canadian National Pentathlon Team and has a silver medal from both the Pan American and Pan Pacific Pentathlon Championships.

== Career ==
At his first audition, he landed the leading role in 12th century drama, Young Ivanhoe. In 2007, he portrayed William Compton in the first seven episodes of the Showtime series The Tudors. In 2010, he began appearing in the television series Lost Girl as Dyson. He played Quint Lane, the 'super lycan', in the film Underworld: Awakening (2012). In 2013, he voiced Captain Canuck in the animated web series of the same name. Holden-Ried provided the voice for the character Crawford Starrick, the main antagonist; on the hit video game Assassin's Creed: Syndicate.

He stars in the 2024 joint Canadian-Swiss production 111 about the aftermath of the 1998 Swissair Flight 111 plane crash off the coast of Peggy's Cove, Nova Scotia that killed all 215 passengers and 14 crew members; filming took place at Peggy's Cove.

== Personal life ==
Holden-Ried has one child, a son.

== Filmography ==
Year	Title	Role	Notes
1995	Young Ivanhoe	Ivanhoe	TV movie
1996	Rowing Through	Kurt Cruise	Film
1997	Habitat	Daryl	Film
1997	When Innocence Is Lost	Kevin	TV movie
1997	Night of the Demons 3	Vince	Film
1997	Riverdale	Shawn Ritchie	Unknown
1998	Going to Kansas City	Charlie Bruckner	Film
1998	The Defenders: Taking the First	McCann	TV movie
1999	Forget Me Never	Unknown	TV movie
1999	Twice in a Lifetime	Young Ken Stryker	Episode: "O'er the Ramparts We Watched"
2000	The Crossing	Capt. Heineman	TV movie
2000	Gossip	Bruce	Film
2000	Hendrix	Noel Redding	TV movie
2000	Girls Who Say Yes	Matt	Short
2000	The Secret Adventures of Jules Verne	George Custer	Episode: "The Rocket's Red Glare"
2001	Chasing Cain	Troy	TV movie
2001	Paradise Falls	Simon	Recurring (Season 1)
2001–2004	Degrassi: The Next Generation	Tracker Cameron	Recurring (Seasons 1–3)
2002	A Killing Spring	Karl Hrynluk	TV movie
2002	Blue Murder	Simon Alcorn	Episode: "Out-of-Towners: Part 2"
2002	K-19: The Widowmaker	Anton	Film
2002	The Many Trials of One Jane Doe	Harold Beckwith	TV movie
2003	Ice Bound: A Woman's Survival at the South Pole	Lunar	TV movie
2003	Street Time	Dwayne	Episodes: "Follow the Money"; "Anger Management"; "Right to Life"
2003	Starhunter	Ritson	Episode: "Stich in Time"
2004	Touch of Pink	Giles	Film
2004	True Crimes: The First 72 Hours	Frankie	Episode: "Cold Hit"
2005	My Uncle Navy and Other Inherited Disorders	Uncle Navy	Short
2005	Big Girl	Gerry	Short
2005	Waking Up Wally: The Walter Gretzky Story	Wayne Gretzky	TV movie
2005	Niagara Motel	R.J.	Film
2006	A Stone's Throw	Jack Walker	Film
2007	The Tudors	William Compton	Recurring (Season 1)
2007	Emotional Arithmetic	Young Jakob	Film
2007	A Broken Life	Mikkhail	Film
2008	Girl's Best Friend	Jake	TV movie
2008	Never Forget	Andy	Film
2008	M.V.P.	Aleksei Protopopov	Recurring (Season 1)
2008	Gossip	Scott Lawton	TV movie
2009	Diamonds	Denver Beeston	TV movie
2009	The Last New Year	Eric	Film
2009	The Death of Alice Blue	Stephen	Film
2009, 2023	Murdoch Mysteries	Prussian Kasper Bomgaarts, Herbert Block	Episodes: "I, Murdoch," "Murder in F Major"
2009	Hidden Crimes	David Lester	TV movie
2009	Deadliest Sea	Bear	TV movie
2009	Santa Baby 2: Christmas Maybe	Colin Nottingham	TV movie
2010	Ben Hur	Gaius	Mini Series
2010	The Bridge	Mike Bodanski	Episodes: "Red Door/Paint It Black"; "The Fat Lady Sings the Blues"; "Chain of Fools"
2010	The Untitled Work of Paul Shepard	Paul Shepard	Film
2010–2015	Lost Girl	Dyson Thornwood	Main (Seasons 1–5)
2011	Republic of Doyle	Joe	Episode: "Crashing on the Couch"
2011	Textuality	Colin	Film
2011–2014	The Listener	Adam Reynolds	Recurring (Season 2); Main (Seasons 4–5)
2012	Underworld Awakening	Quint Lane	Film
2013	Sex After Kids	Gage	Film
2013	Three Days in Havana	Gordie	Film
2013	Hunting Season	Jason	Film
2013	The Returned	Alex Green	Film
2013–2014, 2016	Captain Canuck	Captain Canuck	Main (Seasons 1–2)
2014	Saul: The Journey to Damascus	Jordan	Film
2015	Assassin's Creed Syndicate	Crawford Starrick (voice)	Video game
2016	Dark Matter	Galactic Authority Inspector Kierken	Recurring (Season 2)
2017	Taken	Mike Hall	Episode: "Pilot"
2017	Another You	Father Goodwin	Film
2017	Arrow	Nylander	Episodes: "Deathstroke Returns"; "Promises Kept"
2017–2019	Vikings	Eyvind/Dom	Recurring (Season 5)
2018	Frankie Drake Mysteries	Peter	Episode: "The Pilot"; "Ghosts"
2018	Cardinal	Lasalle	Recurring (Season 2)
2019–2023	Departure	Dom	Main
2019	The Expanse	Coop	Recurring (Season 4)
2019	Lie Exposed	Tom	Film
2020; 2024	The Umbrella Academy	Axel	Recurring (Season 2)
2021	Dark Web: Cicada 3301	Phillip Dubois	Film
2021	Clarice	Karl Wellig	Episodes: "The Silence is Over"; Are You Alright
2023–present	The Way Home	Thomas Coyle	Recurring role (Season 2&3)
2025	The Undertone	Justin	Film
2026	111 Echoes from Halifax		Film
