= Amnon Buchbinder =

American-born Canadian screenwriter and film director (1958–2019)

Amnon Buchbinder (June 17, 1958 - November 30, 2019) was an American-born Canadian screenwriter and film director, most noted for his feature films The Fishing Trip and Whole New Thing.

Born in Missouri, he moved to Canada with his family in childhood, before studying film at the California Institute of the Arts. He was based in Vancouver in the early 1980s, where he was a board member of the Pacific Cinematheque and a programmer for the Vancouver International Film Festival. He made a number of short films, most notably 1983's Oroboros, before studying directing at the Canadian Film Centre. He joined the faculty of York University as a professor of screenwriting in the film department in 1995, and eventually became chair of the department.

The Fishing Trip, his first feature film as a director, was written by Michelle Lovretta, one of his students at York. In 2005 he published the screenwriting text The Way of the Screenwriter, and released Whole New Thing as his second feature film.

Following Whole New Thing he worked on Mortal Coil, a television pilot. Although it was never picked up to series, he published a novel based on it in 2014. In 2015 he released the film Traveling Medicine Show, a compilation of three short docufiction films in which he and his own family had played fictionalized versions of themselves. The following year he released his final film, the interactive documentary Biology of Story.

Buchbinder died on November 30, 2019, of cancer.

He is the brother of musician David Buchbinder.
