= List of Heartland episodes =

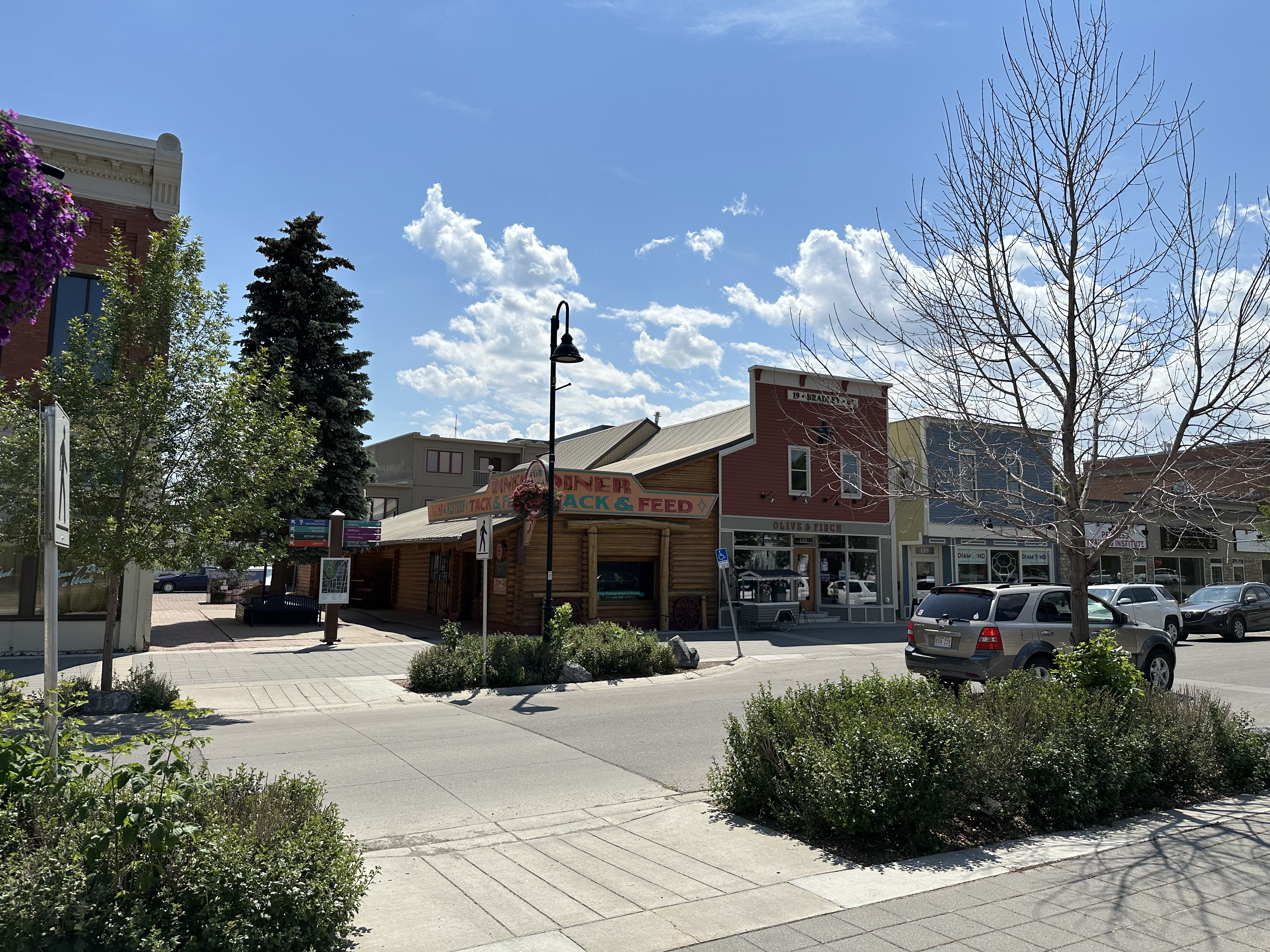
The town of High River, Alberta stands in for fictional Hudson, with a permanent set for Maggie's Diner at the center

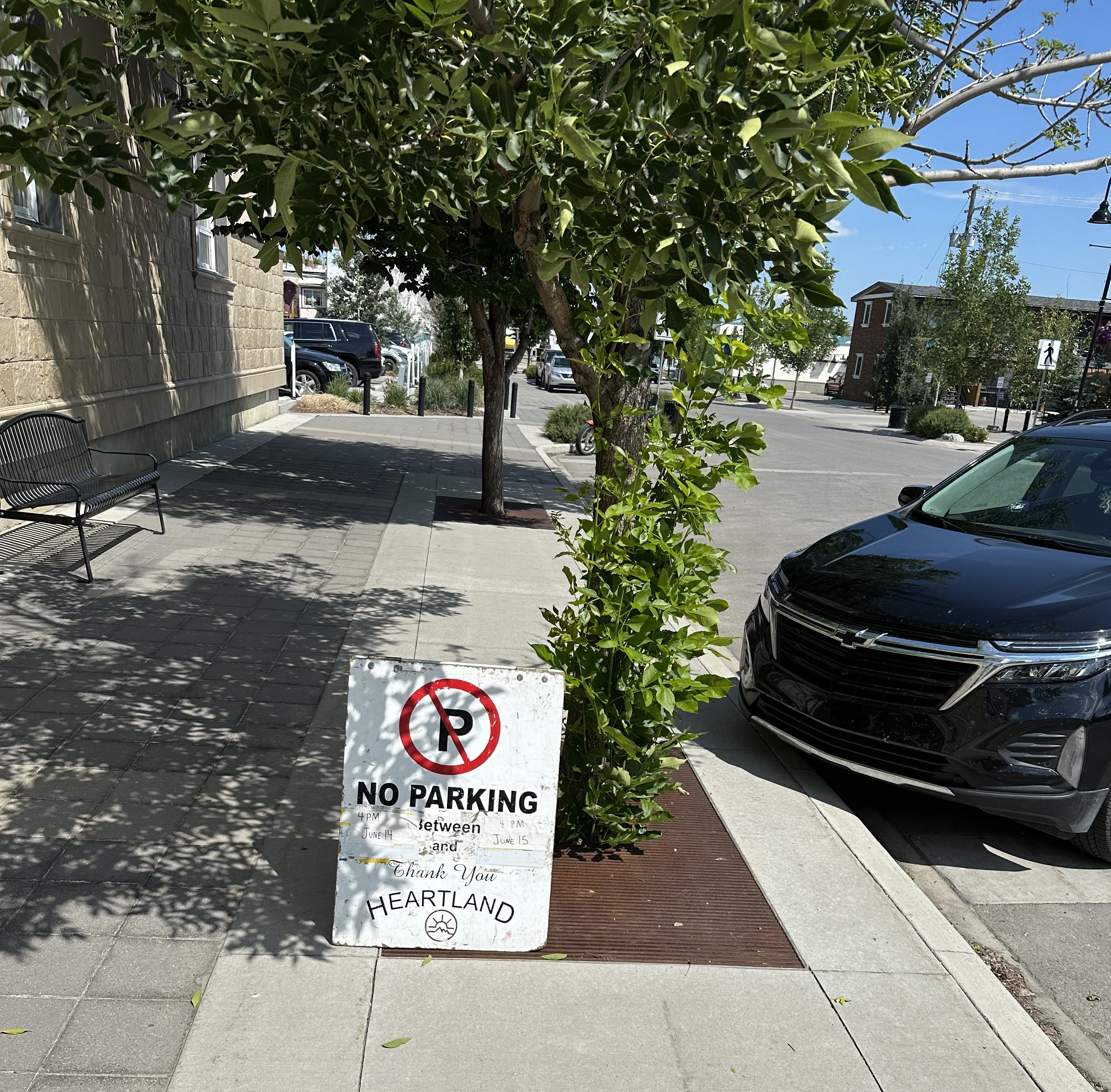
Signs indicate to High River residents when filming will be taking place

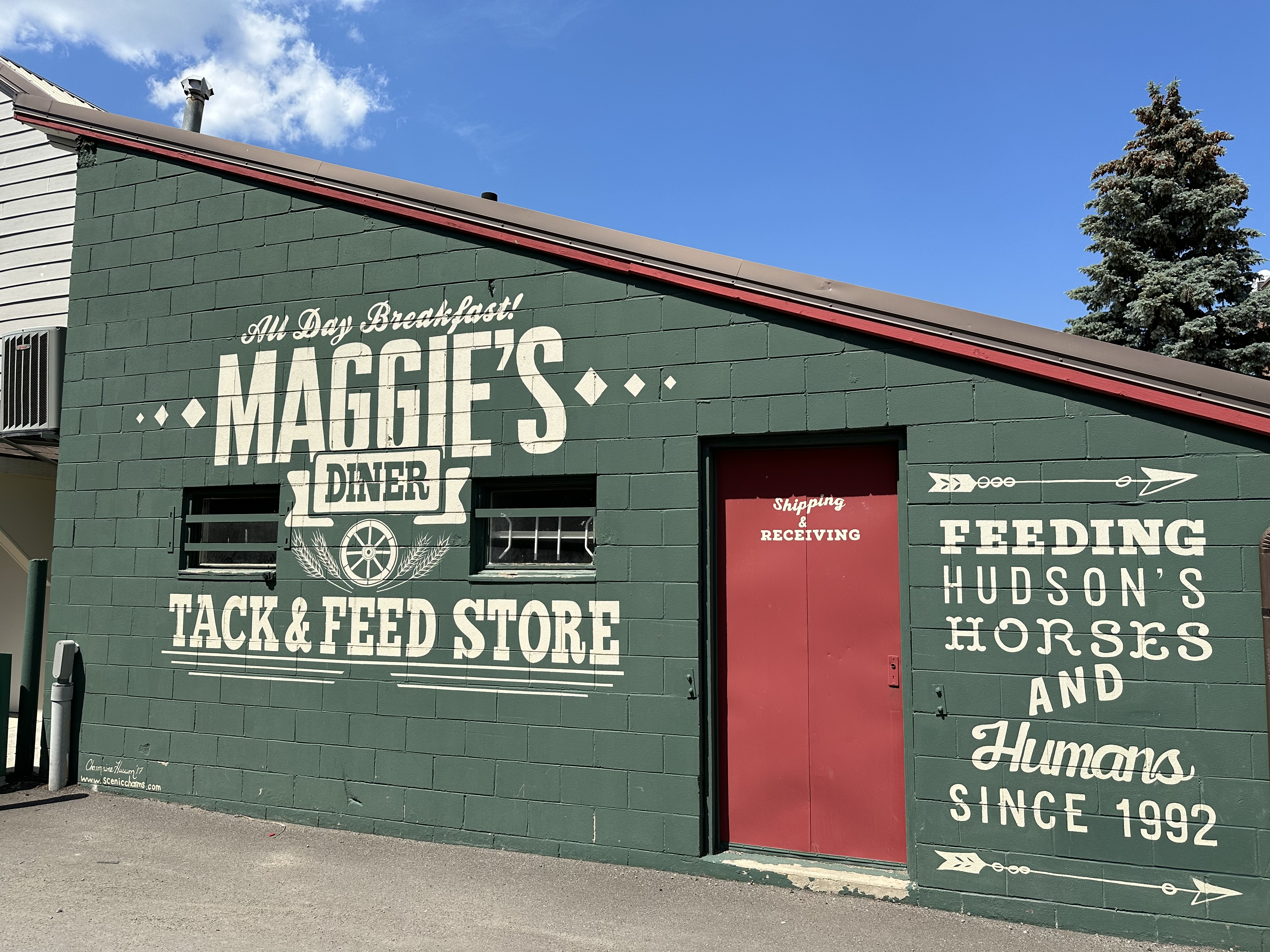
Rear of Maggie's Diner

Heartland is a Canadian family drama television series which debuted on CBC on October 14, 2007. Heartland follows sisters Amy and Lou Fleming, their grandfather Jack Bartlett, and Ty Borden through the highs and lows of life at their horse ranch in the fictional town of Hudson, Alberta.

The plot focuses on Amy, who inherited her mother's ability to heal abused and damaged horses after a tragic accident that led to significant changes in the lives of the characters.

Heartland airs in Canada on CBC at 7 pm (7:30 pm in Newfoundland) on Sundays. The series also airs in the United States on the UpTV and formerly on the defunct Light TV digital broadcast network. It is also distributed online on Netflix internationally (excluding Canada). The series previously also aired on The CW before being transferred solely to UP by 2010. The show became the longest-running one-hour scripted drama in Canadian television history on October 19, 2014, when it surpassed the previous 124-episode record set by Street Legal. As of December 7, 2025, 279 episodes of Heartland have aired, concluding the nineteenth season. The fourteenth season premiered in Canada on January 10, 2021, and airing later in the United States on UP's UP Faith and Family streaming service on May 6, 2021 and premiered on linear Up TV starting July 8, 2021 as part of the summer Thursday night programming schedule. The fifteenth season premiered on Up Faith & Family starting in March 17, 2022 and premiered later on Up TV on May 19. The show was renewed for a 15-episode 16th season on June 1, 2022 and started production on the same day. It premiered in the fall in Canada and will premiere on June 1, 2023 on Up Faith and Family and in the summer on the main Up TV channel in the US. Up Faith and Family season 16, episode 10 was a 'mid-season finale'. Episode 11 was held until fall, September 21, 2023. In May 2025, the series was renewed for a nineteenth season confirmed for another 10 episodes which was confirmed and announced on the same day by lead actress Amber Marshall, in a video posted to social and on her official YouTube channel letting fans know that production was underway. Filming later began in June and at CBC Television's 2025 upfront for the fall 2025-26 season television season, it was announced that the season would premiere sometime in October in Canada. It was later revealed that it would premiere on October 2, with its US premiere to follow on November 4 exclusively on UP Faith & Family and it premiered with a live interactive virtual event for fans featuring interviews from the cast and crew of the show and a live watch party for fans of the show to interact with other fans of the show in an interactive messaging chat box on screen with real time comments being shown live. New episodes will air weekly with one episode per week until December 5 where the show will take a break and then return in January 2026 with the remaining new episodes until early February. This is the first time new episodes of the series were released in tandem between Canada and the US unlike previous, whereas the show would premiere a new season in the fall in Canada and then premiere sometime later on in the winter, spring or summer in the US the following year under a deal between both broadcasters Up TV and CBC and producer SEVEN24 Films. This follows a similar production release schedule pattern to that of the show Murdoch Mysteries, which airs on Ovation TV and streams on Acorn TV, a streaming platform owned by AMC Networks, in the US, where previously new seasons were released in Canada in the fall on CBC, then air in either January or February of the next on Ovation on linear TV, then stream on Acorn TV in March or April every year in the US, however now has reverted to releasing new episodes in the US and Canada on TV, while Ovation airs a repeat on Saturdays as part of its "Mystery Alley" block, and still so far releases on streaming on Acorn TV in the springtime of every year, starting from Season 18 in October 2024, after the Season 17 finale completed airing in May.

== Series overview ==
Season	Episodes	Originally released	
Season	Episodes	First released	Last released
1	13	October 14, 2007	February 24, 2008
2	18	October 5, 2008	March 22, 2009
3	18	October 4, 2009	March 28, 2010
4	18	September 26, 2010	March 27, 2011
Film		December 12, 2010	
5	18	September 18, 2011	March 25, 2012
6	18	September 16, 2012	April 7, 2013
7	18	October 6, 2013	April 13, 2014
8	18	September 28, 2014	March 29, 2015
9	18	October 4, 2015	March 20, 2016
10	18	October 2, 2016	March 26, 2017
11	18	September 24, 2017	April 8, 2018
12	11	January 6, 2019	April 7, 2019
13	10	September 22, 2019	November 24, 2019
14	10	January 10, 2021	March 21, 2021
15	10	October 17, 2021	December 19, 2021
16	15	October 2, 2022	February 5, 2023
17	10	October 1, 2023	December 3, 2023
18	10	October 6, 2024	December 8, 2024
19	10	October 5, 2025	December 7, 2025
20	10	October 4, 2026	December 6, 2026

== Episodes ==
=== Season 1 (2007–08) ===
No. overall	No. in season	Title	Directed by	Written by	Original release date	Prod. code
1	1	"Coming Home"	Ron Murphy	Leila Basen and David Preston	October 14, 2007	163758-1
Amy Fleming is a 15-year-old girl growing up in Hudson, Alberta, with a serious love of horses. She discovers that a horse named Spartan is being abused at Mallen's farm and convinces her mother, Marion, to rescue him. On their way home in a storm, their truck and trailer go off the road and down a hill, crashing. Amy awakens in the hospital and learns that her mother died in the accident. Amy's sister Lou returns from New York City to help. Grandpa Jack refuses to put Spartan down and brings the horse back to Heartland, the family horse ranch, hoping that Amy can help him. Before she can help Spartan, Amy has to come to terms with what happened to her mom. New ranch hand Ty Borden starts working at Heartland.
2	2	"After the Storm"	Ron Murphy	Heather Conkie	October 21, 2007	163758-2
Lou mistakenly sends Mrs. Roach's horse home despite the fact that the animal's fear has yet to be cured, after misinterpreting Amy's description of the horse as "fine". Val Stanton, owner of competitor Briar Ridge Stables, begins spreading rumours about Heartland and their inability to be successful without Marion. Ty's probation officer comes to the ranch while he is showing Amy the jumping course he made for her in the woods. Jack agrees to be Ty's sponsor in place of Marion.
3	3	"Breaking Free"	Ron Murphy	Heather Conkie	October 28, 2007	163758-3
Heartland has its first open house, and Lou invites her and Amy's estranged father Tim. Amy works with a horse of world-famous breeder Lisa Stillman, Promise, who seems unusually aggressive when saddled. Val Stanton challenges Amy by saying the horse has been calmed with drugs. Amy proves her skills by fixing the problem that Val's horse has with jumping. Jack kicks Tim off of the property when he discovers him in the barn. Pegasus is depressed because of Marion's death.
4	4	"Taking Chances"	Steve DiMarco	Leila Basen and David Preston	November 4, 2007	163758-4
Amy and Lou clean out their mother's room and find a seven-year-old letter from their father. Lisa Stillman sends her nephew Ben to live at Heartland. Ty is angry at how he treats horses and challenges Amy to prove that Heartland is different from the other stables. Amy is knocked off her horse and injured while trying to take Ben's horse across the river on a trail ride. Ty accepts a job offer at Briar Ridge, angering Amy, but is fired when Val learns of his past.
5	5	"The Best Laid Plans"	Steve DiMarco	Heather Conkie	December 2, 2007	163758-5
Lou upsets her friends and family as she arranges to have a video made to promote Heartland and micromanages its filming. The video eventually airs on TV after the news and is popular with viewers, dramatically increasing the number of requests Heartland receives for help with troubled horses.
6	6	"One Trick Pony"	Leila Basen and David Preston	Don McBrearty	December 9, 2007	163758-6
Lou's boyfriend Carl visits from New York, but his big-city attitudes clash with the ranch's laid-back lifestyle. Lou learns that she has been fired from her job in New York. Carl proposes to Lou, but she discovers he has been trying to force her to move with him to Chicago. Amy is puzzled why a new horse at Heartland called Pirate won't obey commands; veterinarian Scott unearths the horse's unusual past.
7	7	"Come What May"	Don McBrearty	Leila Basen and David Preston	January 6, 2008	163758-7
Heartland takes in a pregnant mare named Melody. Ty secretly asks Mallory for riding lessons to impress Amy. Ben competes in a horse show and refuses to talk to Lisa. Jack and Ty go on a cattle round-up, and Tim is introduced as the trail boss. Jack and Tim fight each other that night, and Ty learns that Tim is Lou and Amy's father and Jack's former son-in-law. Lisa arrives to talk to Ben, and Jack invites her to stay for pancakes.
8	8	"Out of the Darkness"	Dean Bennett	Heather Conkie	January 13, 2008	163758-8
Amy tries to help a champion stallion and his depressed trainer, who were both injured in a stable fire, and confronts her unresolved feelings about her mother's fatal accident. She exonerates the trainer who was blamed for the fire and had lost his job. Jack becomes increasingly attracted to Lisa. He drives her to a horse sale and it turns into a date, where they both enjoy themselves. Dan Hartfield arrives and introduces himself as Lisa's husband, causing Jack to feel foolish and leave. Lisa later visits Heartland and explains that Dan is her ex-husband.
9	9	"Ghost from the Past"	Dean Bennett	Leila Basen and David Preston	January 20, 2008	163758-9
After elderly Mrs. Bell has a heart attack, Amy takes in her Shetland pony Sugarfoot, to whom Lou grows surprisingly attached. Lou reminisces about learning to ride on Sugarfoot when she was young and about singing to him with Mrs. Bell. Ty's old girlfriend, Kerry Anne, looks for him after taking a job in the kitchens at Briar Ridge. She causes trouble in the process, swindling Soraya and stealing from Ashley, and creating friction with the Heartland family. Amy initially feels threatened by her, but Ty sends Kerry Anne off to British Columbia, knowing that she is bad news.
10	10	"Born to Run"	Ron Murphy	Leila Basen and David Preston	February 3, 2008	163758-10
Prize-winning show jumper Nick Harwell visits Heartland to train an uncooperative Ben and flirt with an interested Lou, with whom he almost has a lunch date. Mallory takes steps to ensure that Copper, her favourite horse, won't be sold by Lou and learns that a ranch hand named Wes has plans to sell a herd of wild mustangs to a slaughterhouse. With everyone's help, Amy frees the mustangs and gets Wes fired.
11	11	"Thicker Than Water"	Ron Murphy	Leila Basen & David Preston	February 10, 2008	163758-11
Amy invites Tim to Heartland, where Lou tries to impress him without admitting to her fear of horses – a fear based on witnessing Tim's accident at the Calgary Stampede years earlier. Tim brings Amy a roping horse with a fear of cattle to be treated. Jack avoids the family reunion with Tim by going on a second date with Lisa. Ty practices his cattle roping skills but discovers he still has a lot to learn about cattle. Lou becomes enraged with Tim for forcing her to jump Spartan and for pushing Amy to work his horse until Amy is thrown from the horse.
12	12	"Nothing endures" "Rising from the Ashes"	Don McBrearty	Heather Conkie	February 17, 2008	163758-12
A barn fire puts Jack in hospital and Heartland in financial crisis, just as Lou was preparing to return to her old life in New York. Jack suffers some amnesia but gradually remembers that the fire was intentional and caused by Wes. Val offers to buy some of Jack's land to expand Briar Ridge, but Tim is against it. Jack remembers an old promise he made to his grandfather and declines to sell any land. The community pulls together to help the Heartland family.
13	13	"Coming Together"	Don McBrearty	Heather Conkie	February 24, 2008	163758-13
It is time for Amy to compete with Spartan in the Fall Finale, with Ty as her coach. The competition sets her against Ashley and her prize horse Apollo. Mr. Mallen, Spartan's abusive previous owner, arrives to reclaim Spartan after receiving a tip from Val. When Ashley confronts her mother about it, Val explains that Mallen has every right to take Spartan back. Jack allows Tim in the house during Amy's post-competition party. Lou considers taking a job offer in New York, prompting Scott to confess his love for her. Lou and Scott kiss. Amy and Ty kiss for the first time while talking in the stables. However, Ty departs for Calgary – to help his estranged father – without telling Amy, leaving her a note. Jack warns Ty not to expect his father to be a hero and assures Ty that he can return to Heartland.

=== Season 2 (2008–09) ===
No. overall	No. in season	Title	Directed by	Written by	Original release date	Prod. code
14	1	"Ghost Horse"	T. W. Peacocke	Heather Conkie	October 5, 2008	146041-1
New ranch hand Caleb joins Heartland and helps Amy capture a wild stallion. Amy struggles to break the mustang, which she calls Ghost. Lou proposes a "corporate equine retreat" at Heartland, which Jack rejects. Lou plans a surprise birthday party for Amy and uses Caleb to get her back home. At Amy's surprise sweet-sixteen party, Mallory's dad Charlie (played by country singer George Canyon) sings "Just Like You." Jack receives a call and leaves the party. At the end of the party, Amy receives a shock: Jack returns with Ty.
15	2	"Letting Go"	T. W. Peacocke	Leila Basen and David Preston	October 12, 2008	146041-2
Ty returns and clashes with Caleb, noticing Caleb's interest in Amy. Ty develops a quick bond with Ghost. Lou gains the loans to start the corporate retreat, but Jack balks at her plans to build it. To prove a point, Lou begins working as a waitress. Tim gives Amy a show-jumping horse named Storm and pushes her to accomplish his dreams for her with it. Caleb flirts with Ashley while leading Amy on. Ty wants to release Ghost, which is being called by another horse. Caleb convinces Ty to release Ghost to protect Amy. This upsets Amy, and Caleb agrees to help Amy recapture Ghost to gain favor with her. Jack worries that ranchers might shoot Ghost, so Ty and Jack ensure Ghost and his mare reach safety. Jack convinces Lou to refurbish the bunk houses and build outhouses; Lou likes the ideas. Amy questions Ty about the horses and then about why he didn’t call her, but he doesn't know what to say.
16	3	"Gift Horse"	Ron Murphy	Leila Basen and David Preston	October 19, 2008	146041-14
Mallory moves to Heartland but misses her parents. Tim puts more pressure on Amy to practice riding every week. The corporate retreat, disparagingly referred to as the Dude Ranch, is almost ready to open, but Lou struggles to decide on horses for it. Ty offers to help Amy with chores but she reacts coldly. Jack and Lou warn that Amy is taking on too much, causing her grades to slip. Jack later confronts Amy over failing a class. Caleb injures a horse named Shorty while showing off for Tim, then tries to use Shorty to gain Amy's approval. Lou stands up to Tim about which horses to buy. Amy tells Tim that she is finished with show jumping and Tim gets mad, yelling at her to sell the horse. Jack speaks to Tim about how to handle his daughters. Caleb asks Amy if it is fair to keep Storm, leaving her with a big decision to make.
17	4	"Dancing in the Dark"	Ron Murphy	Heather Conkie	October 26, 2008	146041-3
Most of the family go to the spring cattle drive. Ray Phillips dies and leaves a herd of cattle as part of his estate. Ty tells Amy why he left and what happened when he was with his Dad; they seem to reconcile and Amy kisses Ty. Lisa tells Jack that she loves him. Tim buys the nearby Big River ranch and is attracted to Ray's daughter Callie. Mallory unsuccessfully tries to push away Jake, a young cowboy. Ty and Caleb fight at the cattle drive about what Caleb said about Amy. Lou stays home to be with Scott, but their plans get interrupted when guests show up to stay at the Dude Ranch a week early. Lou and Scott’s relationship suffers when Scott realizes Lou chooses work over him every time. Scott suggests a break, while Lou suggests marriage, leaving them on an unclear footing.
18	5	"Corporate Cowgirls"	Tim Southam	Heather Conkie	November 2, 2008	146041-4
Lou puts a brave face when former coworkers become customers at her corporate equine retreat. On the trail ride Lou's friends fight, one of them kisses Tim (who pushes her away) and Lou becomes upset. Amy is not sure she wants to get together with Ty. Lou admits that Scott rejected her proposal and that their future is unclear. At the end of the trip, everyone makes up and Lou's friends promise to spread the word in New York about the Heartland Equestrian Connection. Ty tells Amy he meant it when they kissed and plans to make her a dinner. Amy cancels her plans to spend the weekend with Ty when Caleb doesn't show up for the trail ride because he is trying to get with Ashley. Mallory takes Spartan on a ride, during which the horse grazes at a pesticide-treated roadside and suffers from poisoning. Ty figures out what needs to be done to save Spartan. Kit Bailey shows up looking for Caleb and helps, with Caleb coming to help out also. Mallory apologizes to Amy for what happened but makes Amy worry more about Kit and Ty talking.
19	6	"Holding Fast"	Tim Southam	Susin Nielsen	November 9, 2008	146041-5
Amy comes across a Mountie, Constable Rodriguez, trying to save a young boy from drowning. She tries to help Rodriguez's horse, Venture, who has developed a fear of water. Amy gets Caleb to help with Venture instead of waiting for Ty. Amy agrees to a date with Caleb, thinking they fixed Venture, but when Rodriguez arrives, they fixed nothing and things are worse. Amy uncovers the connection to Rodriguez's feeling of responsibility for his brother's drowning six years earlier and asks Ty to help. With Ty helping, they actually help Venture and Rodriguez form a bond again. Ty asks Amy on a date to celebrate, but she tells him she already has plans. Lou attends a polo match for Nick Harwell's team. Scott and Lou break up. Lisa asks Jack to attend the polo match with her. He initially refuses but later joins her. Ashley takes Caleb on a date to the polo club. Mallory tries to get rid of Jake but misses him. Ty watches Amy leave for her date with Caleb, wondering where he stands with Amy.
20	7	"Sweetheart of the Rodeo"	Steve DiMarco	Leila Basen and David Preston	November 16, 2008	146041-6
The annual Hudson Heritage Rodeo takes place. Amy volunteers to team rope with Caleb when his partner backs out. Tim gets mad at Amy when he finds out that she was going to rope after she stopped riding. Ty is not happy that Amy is roping with Caleb but agrees to help train her for the rodeo. Amy and Caleb place third in team roping, but Amy ignores Ty again when he tries to congratulate her. Ty competes in bull riding, earning the respect of Jack, Tim, and Caleb, but Amy gets mad at him and thinks he did it for her. Competing for the Queen of the Rodeo title, Kit wins, Maggie's daughter Soraya is runner-up, and Ashley is second runner-up. Ashley is noticeably upset at the rodeo after-party and drinks heavily. Amy learns that Apollo was sold. Amy drives a drunk Ashley home, but they have an accident. Ty and Kit find the wreck; Amy runs into Ty's arms but pushes him away when she sees Kit get out of his truck. The next morning, Val looks for Ashley to explain about the wreck, and Ty takes the blame. Amy thanks Ty for covering for her but leaves him when Caleb comes, saying he signed them up for another rodeo. Jack thanks Ty for protecting the girls.
21	8	"Summer's End"	Don McBrearty	Heather Conkie	November 30, 2008	146041-7
In the middle of a heat wave. Ty's father Brad brings six horses to Heartland in the middle of the night, one of which has a bad head wound and has to be euthanized. The other five are in bad shape and dehydrated. Amy recognizes one of the horses as Apollo, Ashley's former jumper. When Ashley is told she confronts Val and accuses her of selling Apollo to a kill buyer. Ashley leaves home and Caleb finds her and asks Jack to let her stay at the Dude Ranch. When Scott learns that Lou is dating Rodriguez, he asks her to find another veterinarian. Once the horses have recovered, Lou makes a deal to buy them. Rodriguez comes through at the last moment so that Heartland can keep the horses. Amy pushes Ty to reconcile with his dad, they spend the day together and things go well but Ty's dad leaves in the middle of the night, stealing the money for the horses. Ty reaches out to Kit because he feels Amy is just pitying him. Rain finally comes to break the heatwave and Ty and Amy kiss but he stops because he is afraid of hurting her.
22	9	"Showdown!"	Sudz Sutherland	Leila Basen and David Preston	December 7, 2008	146041-8
Amy and Soraya begin a new year of school, while Mallory is sent to boarding school and Ty begins online courses to finish high school. Tim learns of cattle thefts and hires Caleb and Ty to watch his herd. The police try to help track the rustlers. Amy comes looking for Ty and Caleb, when Caleb doesn't do his job at the ranch, and is caught by the rustlers. Ty and Caleb rescue Amy from the rustlers, who shoot Tim in the shoulder and steal his entire herd. Amy ignores Ty as he tries to explain his fears of hurting her. Amy gets mad at Caleb when she finds out he is going to watch Tim's cattle and Caleb kisses her, telling her that she thinks too much. Amy realizes that Ty saw them kiss. Amy finds out from Kit that Ty is going to finish high school and tells Kit that there is nothing going on with her and Ty. Kit tells Ty what Amy said while studying, and then they kiss.
23	10	"True Enough"	Sudz Sutherland	Heather Conkie	January 4, 2009	146041-9
Tim exploits his injury to enjoy special treatment from everyone. He has been secretly dating Callie Phillips, who arrives to take care of him, but he lies to her about having told everyone. Tim returns to Big River, and Callie leaves him due to the lie. Amy feels guilty over Tim's injury and is jealous of Ty dating Kit. Caleb is not showing up for work and Amy goes to talk to him. Ty helps settle a new horse (Boxer) into Heartland's stable; when they have trouble they call the owner, Hank Adams, to come help. While he is there, his daughter and Amy's teacher, Ruth Adams, frantically arrives and explains that Hank has Alzheimer's disease. Amy agrees to keep Boxer and to let Hank visit when he can, and Ruth brings Hank to see Boxer and listen to records he played at the house. Amy goes to see Caleb again and he tells her Ty is with Kit and he gave up on her too easy. Caleb says he will fight for Amy and she kisses Caleb and tells him to get back to work.
24	11	"Starstruck!"	Dean Bennett	Leila Basen and David Preston	January 11, 2009	146041-10
Caleb promises to buy Amy an expensive belt she saw at Maggie's with his next rodeo prize. Hollywood starlet Mindy Fanshaw arrives at Heartland, taking exclusive use of the ranch and having everyone sign non-disclosure agreements. She takes an interest in the Ty–Amy–Caleb love triangle and makes Amy realize she can't make up her mind about Ty and Caleb. She entices Amy with an acting job and seduces Caleb into a kiss. While Amy is at school, Mindy convinces Caleb to let her ride Pegasus, with a calculated paparazzi photo-op orchestrated by her agent. Pegasus is spooked and bolts, throwing Mindy and injuring itself. Ashley and Soraya learn that Mindy is at Heartland and become upset with Amy for not telling them. Amy tries to apologize but accuses Soraya of telling the paparazzi. Mallory is found hiding in a Dude Ranch cabin, having run away from the boarding school with Jake's help; she collects things Mindy has used to sell online and repay Jake. Lou kicks Mindy out for being spoiled and causing trouble. Mindy leaves Amy the expensive belt, which she gives to Soraya as an apology. Also, Lou and Scott start talking again.
25	12	"Divorce Horse"	Dean Bennett	Heather Conkie	January 18, 2009	146041-11
Lisa arrives with Diva, a horse said to be cursed to cause the divorce of its owner, and meddles in the love lives at Heartland. Mackenzie Hutton comes to be married at the Dude Ranch, but although she wants a small casual wedding, Lisa and Mackenzie's mother talk her into a large sit-down reception dinner. Lisa plays matchmaker for Lou and gives her email address to Peter, the son of a friend. Ty helps Amy with Diva, and Amy expresses how she'd missed working with him, while Caleb is mysteriously busy and aloof. Ty and Kit double date with Amy and Caleb, during which Caleb takes a call from Ashley knowing that it undermines Amy's confidence. Mackenzie's fiancé Ian arrives and is upset at the changes, and when they can't agree on anything Mackenzie threatens to call off the wedding. Lou blames it on Lisa's meddling, but the couple reunites and returns to a simpler ceremony, at which Amy and Ty can't stop looking at each other. Unable to sell Diva as a show horse, Lisa gives Diva to Mackenzie as a wedding gift. Amy finds Ashley at Caleb's trailer. Lou begins exchanging emails with Peter.
26	13	"Seismic Shifts"	T. W. Peacocke	Susin Nielsen	February 8, 2009	146041-12
Bedford Oil conducts oil exploration at Hudson. The blasting frightens animals, but the ranchers don't have oil or mining rights to their land. Lou mobilizes the community and has Bedford employees leave the Dude Ranch. She holds a town hall meeting with the community, their MLA, and oilman P.W. Morris, and the following morning the townspeople protest the drilling team. Lisa apologizes to Lou and takes her to her first date with Peter, only to find that he is P.W. Morris. Lou leaves and says that it can't work, but they remain drawn to each other and kiss. Caleb forcefully tries to explain about Ashley but Amy dismisses him, saying that there is nothing between them. Caleb allows Ashley to stay with him following a fight with her mother. Convinced of a parallel with Wuthering Heights, Mallory thinks Amy and Ty are meant to be together and tells Amy, who misunderstands that she's supposed to be with Caleb. Amy tries to reconcile with Caleb but leaves him again when she discovers him hiding Ashley. Ty listens to Amy's feelings about the breakup and they hug; Mallory later tells Amy that she had been talking about Ty all along.
27	14	"Do or Die"	T. W. Peacocke	Mark Haroun	February 15, 2009	146041-13
Ty's probation officer Clint arrives with troubled kids Tara and Badger, who soon set a fire, joyride in Ty's truck, and hospitalize Clint with an allergic reaction. Clint urges Ty to help them. The kids refuse a riding lesson while mocking Mallory, and Ty becomes forceful with Badger for flicking a lit cigarette near the barn. Tara flirts with Ty, and Badger lets a horse loose and swings at Ty with a hay hook. Ty confides to Amy the pressure of being the poster boy for the rehabilitation program. He tells her of his crime: attempting to kill Wade, his abusive stepfather. Through pillow fights and breaking curfew, Mallory is able to develop a friendship with Tara. Badger overhears that Tara is afraid of him and runs away with a horse; Ty rescues him and Badger determines to talk to Tara. Caleb asks Amy on a trail ride but she refuses. When Amy later goes to see Caleb, she finds him with Ashley. Jack has Ashley drive Val for medical tests, after which Ashley cries to Caleb that her home could be in bad shape. Lou throws away Peter's gifts, but later meets with him to talk.
28	15	"Dark Horse"	Dean Bennett	Leila Basen and David Preston	March 1, 2009	146041-5
Lou revives the Hudson Charity Derby, which had ended years earlier due to a dispute between Tim and Jack over who had won. To settle the score, they both sign up for the race. Amy helps get Tim's horse in shape. Jack's horse Paint is too old to race, so Kit brings him a former racehorse called Money which Ty helps them train. Ty and Amy can't help becoming competitive. Tim and Jack do well in the race until Tim (who is troubled by his old injury) falls off his horse and Jack stops to help him. Scott wins the race and Tim and Jack tie for second. Amy and Ty are made spotters at the halfway point but are unable to communicate with Lou and end up play fighting and almost kiss. Amy had agreed to do a team roping competition with Caleb, causing him to think that they're getting back together, but she later backs out for being too busy. Ashley tells Caleb that something is going on between Amy and Ty, and Val offers to sponsor Caleb on the professional rodeo circuit so that he can leave Hudson.
29	16	"The Ties That Bind"	Dean Bennett	Penny Gummerson	March 8, 2009	146041-16
Spartan is stolen, and Ty and Amy search for the horse at horse auctions. Amy becomes upset when Ty buys a horse (Harley), thinking he bought it to replace Spartan. They see Spartan being purchased by Wes; Amy contests the sale but cannot prove ownership. Ty tries to buy Spartan back from Wes but gets in a fight. Ty reluctantly agrees to help Amy steal Spartan from the auction house to protect her from jail. Ty is caught and arrested and bailed out by Jack. Ty, facing serious jail time, tells Amy he would do it all again for her. Jack and Tim find Wes and force him to sign a bill of sale, returning Spartan. Jack grounds Amy until further notice and tells Ty that Officer Rodriguez agrees to forget about the incident after Ty completes two months of “community service”; that is, two months of extra work for Jack. Lou goes to extreme measures to avoid anyone seeing her with Peter. Caleb obtains his rodeo card, and Val again offers him sponsorship to keep him on the road and away from Ashley.
30	17	"Full Circle"	Don McBrearty	Penny Gummerson	March 15, 2009	146041-17
Amy struggles with Spartan after she gets him back and blames Ty for his being stolen. Amy takes the horse to Marion's Aboriginal friend Victor Whitetail, who helps people connect with their horses. He helps Amy process her feelings and realize it's she that has the problem, using traditional Aboriginal methods. Jack is not sure about Victor and Amy begins to suspect that Victor was more than a friend to her mother after Tim left. While Amy is away, Ty trains Harley but gets into a fight with Kit when he prefers using Amy's training methods to Kit's. Ty breaks up with Kit, realizing that he has always loved Amy. When he picks Amy up at Victor's, he tries to tell her how he feels but she stops him from saying anything. Peter books the Dude Ranch in order to spend time with Lou, who continues to keep their relationship a secret. Peter tells Lou that he has an ex-wife with whom he shares Max, a dog that Lou thought was a child. Lou promises to let Peter meet her family. Ashley is distraught because Caleb hasn't contacted her since leaving for the rodeo circuit.
31	18	"Step By Step"	Don McBrearty	Heather Conkie	March 22, 2009	146041-18
Ty is concerned about the wild mustangs up by the fishing cabin that might need help. Amy makes a plan to sneak up to the cabin with Ty to feed the horses and talk. Jack talks to Scott and allows Amy and Ty to go to the cabin to feed them. Mallory ruins Ty’s surprise about him getting his diploma. Tim, having money troubles, approaches Val about selling her some of his land. After spreading hay at the cabin Ty and Amy start to talk over lunch but go out to see the mustangs and Ty falls ill, passing out. Amy takes care of him overnight. In the morning, Amy confesses to Ty that she has messed things up but has always loved him. With the roads closed and Amy and Ty stuck at the cabin, Lou finally introduces Peter to Jack and it goes badly, upsetting Jack. However, Jack begrudgingly accepts help from Peter to clear roads in the morning to get Amy and Ty home. Val confesses to Ashley that she paid Caleb off to go away and causes her to be upset with both of them. Ashley kicks Caleb out of the trailer when he gets home from the rodeo. Jack confronts Tim about trying to sell some of his land and gives him a loan to help him out.

=== Season 3 (2009–10) ===
No. overall	No. in season	Title	Directed by	Written by	Original release date	Prod. code
32	1	"Miracle"	Steve DiMarco	Heather Conkie	October 4, 2009	159251-1
A horse trailer collides with a bus on the highway. Amy helps calm Caesar, a gelding with Olympic prospects, while trainer Stuart Forrest frees him from a barbed-wire fence. A crowd records videos, one of which is presented on the news. Amy feels pressure as she is dubbed "Miracle Girl" while trying to treat Caesar for fear of loud noises, vehicles and trailers. Ty interns with Scott while trying to get accepted to a veterinarian program, but is conflicted when they have to euthanize injured horses at the collision. Caleb has been living in his truck, unable to get his trailer back from Ashley, and Jack lets him stay in the loft with Ty. Ashley takes a job at Maggie's to support herself. Amy and Ty scheme to get Ashley and Caleb back together. Jack is upset when Tim uses some of the loaned money to buy a herd of cattle. Lisa returns from France; Jack tells her that he missed her but that the ranch kept him busy. He has actually spent a good deal of time taking Val to treatments for blood cancer which is now in remission. Val hasn't told Ashley about it.
33	2	"Little Secrets"	Steve DiMarco	Leila Basen and David Preston	October 11, 2009	159251-2
Amy and Lou are struggling to keep up with the rise in business after the Miracle Girl video. A client shows up 6 weeks early with her daughter Taylor and horse Trooper. When Lou tells her they are too busy, Tim steps in and tells them Amy can see them that day. Ty and Amy come up with a plan to get Caleb out of the loft and back to his trailer and setup with Ashley. Amy finds out that Taylor was hurt by Trooper but realizes quickly that it's not Trooper but maybe Taylor that has a problem. Amy asks Mallory to get info on Taylor to see what’s going on with her. Taylor's mom confides in Lou that she is going to be getting a divorce when Lou tells her that Trooper is not the problem. Lou and Tim don't agree with how to expand the Dude Ranch to take advantage of the influx in business. Ashley sees through the plan to get her and Caleb together so Amy and Ty back off. When Tim doesn't get his way he asks Lou to buy him out of the Dude Ranch, which she refuses and tells him that they are more than business partners, they are family. Taylor tries to provoke Trooper into throwing her again when she finds out her parents are getting divorced. Amy tells Taylor's mom about what has happened and agrees to keep Trooper while Taylor gets help.
34	3	"Man's Best Friend"	Dean Bennett	Heather Conkie	October 18, 2009	159251-3
Lisa and Jack drive to a wedding, but Jack’s truck breaks down, causing them to miss the event. The family encourages Jack to buy a new truck, which he begrudgingly does. Amy is excited about taking Ty to the school dance, but Ty is not sure about going. Jake asks Amy to help his horse Kramer that keeps escaping. Amy agrees to keep Kramer to help with Duke, a horse that's withdrawn since his stablemate died. Jack, not happy with the new truck, leaves for the fishing cabin after arguing with Lisa; there he has a flashback about receiving the truck as an anniversary present from Lyndy. Amy realizes Kramer is a natural jumper and tells Mallory it would be a great horse for her to learn on and help get rid of his extra energy. Lisa goes to see Jack and they talk about the truck. Ty takes dancing lessons from Lou so he doesn’t embarrass Amy. Jack takes the new truck back and gets a used truck almost as old as his truck, which he got back to use for parts. Ty's truck breaks down on the way to the dance and Amy blames him, saying he just didn't want to go. Ty gets Amy to dance with him in the truck bed and gives Amy a promise ring. Ashley asks a rich private-school boy to take her to the dance to make Caleb jealous, while Caleb tries to tow his trailer away.
35	4	"The Haunting of Hanley Barn"	Dean Bennett	Mark Haroun	October 25, 2009	159251-4
Badger runs away from his foster home to see his birth parents, but they moved and he doesn't know where they are. Ty hides Badger from Clint, while Badger and Mallory reconnect. Amy and Ty spend the night at the Hanley barn to investigate what is spooking the horses. After recounting the tale of a lovelorn drifter whose ghost haunts the barn, Caleb, Soraya and Ashley try to scare them. Noises draw Amy and Ty to the loft, which they were warned to keep away from (the structure has dry rot), where they find Mallory and Badger. Amy discovers that the horse feed has been spiked with glycogen loader by Brett, a neighbour who wants to force Hanley into foreclosure to buy the land. Ty helps Badger apologize to Clint. Mallory finds a drawing of herself in Badger's sketchpad, and they kiss. Jack explains that he's tough on Lou because she's like himself while Amy is more like Marion. Mrs. Bell tells Lou about her first boyfriend, the drifter from the ghost story, and later releases a butterfly in his memory.
36	5	"Glory Days"	Don McBrearty	Leila Basen and David Preston	November 1, 2009	159251-5
To impress Ashley, Caleb takes lessons in steer wrestling from Tim, who warns that it is even more dangerous and unpredictable than bullriding. Tim considers returning to competition despite his age and injury. Tim repays Jack's loan with cattle, and Jack also relives his glory days while working the herd. Jack realizes he can't do it all himself and asks Tim's help, but Tim wants compensation and a grazing fee, which could cost more than the loan. Ty helps Scott with Kit's barrel horse Daisy which is foaling, but the foal is stillborn. Kit and Ty sort out their lingering break-up issues while Ty comforts Kit. With some difficulty, they get Daisy to adopt Merlin, an orphaned foal. Lou invites Peter to manage his business from Heartland while his office undergoes renovation, and he tells Mallory that she has more than paid for her share of Copper's ownership. Val tells Ashley that Caleb is a good guy, and that he repaid her sponsorship money. Val and Ashley reconcile and Ashley makes peace with Caleb before returning to Briar Ridge.
37	6	"Growing Pains"	Don McBrearty	Susin Nielsen	November 8, 2009	159251-6
Daisy rejects Merlin, which is brought to Heartland for caregiving. Ty and Amy schedule feedings every 2 hours but the stress leads them to clash over how best to raise Merlin. Lou arranges for Peter to meet wealthy and eco-minded oil billionaire Richard Chenoweth at Heartland, but Richard acts strangely outside of Peter's observation. A wildlife official warns Jack about a cougar; its presence affects the horses, and Richard falls during a trail ride. Peter defends Lou from Richard's unwanted advances, and Lou is able to satisfyingly avoid a threatened lawsuit from the unscrupulous businessman. Ashley feels suffocated as Val constantly tries to reconnect with her. After the cougar is captured, Jack discovers her cub. Jack’s nurturing side is revealed as he cares for the cub until Scott, the veterinarian, can take the cub to the wildlife preserve.
38	7	"The Starting Gate"	Grant Harvey	David Moses	November 15, 2009	159251-7
Ty begins working at the Hudson race track and receives some light hazing. Lisa's horse Lightning Dexter drops his jockey at the starting gate and is disqualified. Amy is too busy to work with the horse, so Lisa sells it to Tim as a riding horse. Tim then guilts Amy into working with the horse, upsetting Lisa, and Jack has to smooth things over. Amy determines that jockey Liam may be to blame after Ty tells Amy that Liam hazed Ty with a hand buzzer. Liam confesses to Lisa that he shocked the horse with the buzzer, and Lisa fires him. Ty's estranged mother Lily arrives, saying that she has left Wade, her abusive second husband, and she wants to reconnect with Ty. Lou competes in a local jam-making competition; she doesn’t win, but the judge, who manages Hudson Supermarket, allows her to sell her jam in the store.
39	8	"The Fix"	Grant Harvey	Penny Gummerson	November 22, 2009	159251-8
Ty hides Lily when Wade tracks her to Hudson. Tim enters Lightning Dexter in a local race and hires Ty to guard it. Lisa has another horse in the race, and Jack again has to play peacemaker between Lisa and Tim. Amy tells Ty when Lily sneaks away to meet Wade; Ty confronts them and takes Lily back to the ranch. Wade gets back at Ty by feeding salt to Dexter, and Tim blames Ty when Dexter finishes last. Ty and Wade square off. Amy doesn't have much time to get a new horse ready and asks Caleb to help; he provides good insight.
40	9	"Broken Arrow"	Ron Murphy	Leila Basen and David Preston	December 6, 2009	159251-9
It is Ty's last day at Heartland before leaving for veterinarian school. Amy wants some quality time with her boyfriend, while Lou plans a big dinner with the help of her longtime friend Marnie. However, Ty flies to British Columbia with Scott to see a wounded horse. While away, Ty gets a gift for Amy. Caleb seeks a pay raise from Jack. Val hires Amy to help get Apollo back on the show-jumping circuit, but the problem is Ashley, who doesn't want to ride him. Lou struggles when babysitting Jerry Junior for Marnie and is concerned that she may soon have a baby of her own. Amy goes to the airport to receive Scott and Ty on their return but learns the plane has lost radio contact.
41	10	"Eye of the Wolf"	Ron Murphy	Heather Conkie	January 3, 2010	159251-10
Amy returns to Heartland with news that Scott and Ty's plane is missing. The police tell them that there have been no sightings of the aircraft. Amy puts together a search plan. Peter helps by dispatching Bedford Oil helicopters. Ty tries to help critically injured Scott, taking brief hikes from the crash site to try to determine their location and to leave markers. Back at the crash site, Ty encounters a wolf by the fire he made. After four days, a helicopter reports smoke. Amy, Lou and Peter ride into the area and follow Ty's hiking markers to the crash. Caleb tells Ashley how he really feels about her. Lou talks to Peter about his life plans, and he assures her that she is part of his future. Ty tells Amy that he thought he was going to die; he thought the wolf was going to attack, but it just stayed by the fire, watching Ty and Scott all night.
42	11	"Catch and Release"	T. W. Peacocke	Mark Haroun	January 10, 2010	159251-13
Ty is troubled by dreams about the wolf. Worried about Ty, Jack offers to take him fishing, with Peter and Tim joining on the trip. Peter's dog Max encounters a porcupine with bad results. Peter asks for Jack's blessing to marry Lou. Tim takes it personally that Peter asked Jack instead of him and gets in a fight, accidentally hitting Peter. Peter later asks Tim's blessing to marry Lou and receives the same response as Jack's: If Lou said yes, she could probably do a lot worse. Jack gives Ty advice about getting sleep. The women have a girls’ night out. Mallory struggles with friends and finding her place. In a hurry to take Ashley on a date, Caleb neglects to fix a fence, and cattle overrun the Dude Ranch before a photo shoot. Ty meets with Scott to talk about his dreams.
43	12	"The Reckoning"	T. W. Peacocke	Penny Gummerson	January 17, 2010	159251-11
Victor Whitetail visits Heartland, leaving Tim to wonder if Victor was more than friends with his ex-wife. Ty convinces Kit to bring her star barrel horse Daisy to Amy, but when Amy brings Kit into the healing process, Kit puts Ty between them. Jack causes issues with Victor because Jack thinks that Victor and Marion were intimate. Peter invites Lou to Paris; she is overjoyed until she learns that it is a business trip. Peter changes his plans to be home for Lou. Tim forces Victor to leave, causing a rift between himself and the girls. Amy organizes a memorial ride in honor of her mother because she missed the funeral. Peter proposes to Lou.
44	13	"Quarantine"	Grant Harvey	Ken Craw	January 24, 2010	159251-13
When Daisy comes down with strangles (equine distemper), Heartland's stables are put under quarantine. Thus, Tango, a horse that Amy is treating, must stay there. Tim turns away a reporter, causing issues for the Dude Ranch. Amy is upset that Ty is spending time with Kit, and furious when she learns that Daisy came from a rodeo where numerous other horses contracted strangles. When Pegasus becomes symptomatic, Amy must face the possibility of losing her mother's horse; Tim likewise expresses feelings about Pegasus and blames Ty for exposing him. Tango also contracts strangles, but Ty’s intervention saves him. Mallory tries to convince Jack to drive her to an art museum event where she hopes to see Badger. Amy, Ty, Jack, Lou, and Tim kneel by Pegasus as he passes away. Kit admits that she knew about the outbreak but thought that Daisy was okay. Scott reassures Ty about his work with Pegasus and Tango.
45	14	"The Happy List"	Chris Potter	Heather Conkie	January 31, 2010	159251-14
Ty buys a motorcycle to rebuild, upsetting Amy. Ty wants to travel to find himself and talks about going with Caleb, but later changes his mind. Caleb fears it's bad luck to take Ashley on the circuit. Amy explains the motorcycle makes her worry and reminds her of the plane crash. Ty and Amy ride the motorcycle together. On Val's advice, Ashley follows Caleb to the rodeo, which is broadcast on TV. Caleb's bull ride goes well until he becomes entangled in his rigging and passes out. Val comes through her medical tests and composes a "Happy List" of things to do, including a return to show jumping coached by Amy. Jack may also be on Val's list. Lou and Peter begin planning their wedding, but Lou becomes obsessed with Peter's first wedding. Peter calls for a break so they can each think about what they want. Mallory pines for Badger, but when Jake shows up with a new girlfriend, she seems unable to let Jake go (and Jake seems unready to part with Mallory).
46	15	"Second Chances"	Dean Bennett	Susin Nielsen	March 7, 2010	159251-15
Amy and Ty begin looking after Mr. Hanley's abandoned farm after finding his untended horse. Hanley returns days later to say he is bankrupt and losing the farm, and Amy is upset with him for leaving his horses. The Society for the Prevention of Cruelty to Animals (SPCA) learn of this and plan to take the horses and possibly euthanize some of them. Ty and Amy find Hanley's sister has returned to Hudson and she helps save the farm. Lou is busy with the Dude Ranch and wedding plans. She asks Marnie to be her maid of honour after Amy declines, but they have issues about WWAHH (Women Working at Home in Hudson) causing Marnie to quit. Reminded of the importance of family, Amy asks to be Lou's maid of honour. Mallory ingratiates herself to Lou, hoping to be a bridesmaid. Lisa returns from Europe and suspects something is going on between Jack and Val. They talk about it and Jack proposes to Lisa. Caleb is released from hospital and moves into his trailer, leaving Ashley, Val and Ty concerned about his recovery after he falls. Lou allows Caleb to stay at the Dude Ranch. Caleb and Ashley argue and he blames her for his accident.
47	16	"Spin Out"	Dean Bennett	Leila Basen and David Preston	March 14, 2010	159251-16
Caleb's truck is repossessed and he lists his horse for sale. Tim questions him about it, accuses him of taking too much pain medication and gives him an ultimatum: Caleb pays the rate for staying at the Dude Ranch or he leaves. Jack allows Caleb to stay at Heartland if he works toward his recovery. Ashley talks to Caleb but they argue; later, he steals Ty's motorbike to visit her but wrecks it. Ty confronts Caleb over this, punches him and takes away his pain medication. Caleb later apologizes to Ty, and Ashley gets Caleb's truck back. Mallory decides to try out for the rodeo team to make friends. She makes the team, but not in a position she wants. Amy borrows Caleb's horse to help Mallory. Caleb helps Amy coach Mallory, which helps him get back in the saddle. Amy and Lou hear rumours of Jack and Lisa's secret engagement –Jack didn't want to overshadow Lou's wedding – and are not sure what to make of it. Lisa has second thoughts after a visit from Val, but Jack and Lisa tell the girls. Lou freaks out, making it about herself.
48	17	"Ring of Fire"	Steve DiMarco	Leila Basen and David Preston	March 21, 2010	159251-17
Victor Whitetail visits to tell Amy that he has recommended her to replace him in the Ring of Fire (colt starting contest), though she has doubts. Lou and Tim want her to do it for the business but Jack is against it, while Ty encourages Amy and shows her a photo of her mother winning the contest. After studying her mom's journal, Amy decides to enter the contest. She competes against Garrett and Chase, who look to be way ahead of her on the first days. Tim wants her to win so that he can feel better about leaving for winter racing in California. On the final day of the contest, Garrett fails to complete the course, and Chase can't get his horse in the trailer. Amy completes everything and strikes the same pose as the photo of her mom to honor her. Mallory's rodeo team buddies ask her to cover for them while they go to Calgary. Caleb starts to get back with Ashley. Ashley says she loves him, but they break up because he chooses the rodeo over her. Peter surprises Lou for their anniversary by coming from Dubai to see her.
49	18	"In the Cards"	Steve DiMarco	Heather Conkie	March 28, 2010	159251-18
Amy is invited on the Ring of Fire Tour and talks with Ty about doing it together. Chase brings his horse Zephyr for Amy to treat; she initially refuses, but he charms her into working with him. Chase and Amy seem interested in each other. Amy can't express what Ty's promise ring means to her when Chase asks about it. Ty notices their closeness; when he asks Amy about it, she accuses him of controlling her. Ty tells her that he's taking a trip, before veterinarian school becomes hectic, and she breaks up with him and returns his ring. Amy rides after Ty as he leaves to apologize and to agree that he should go, and he tells her to go on the tour. Amy asks for his ring back and tells Ty not to worry, though she is hesitant about saying "I love you.” Peter's company may undergo a merger, and he wants to marry Lou immediately and move to Dubai. Lou agrees, though problems arise. Lisa tries to help without taking over; she finds a dress while Jack finds a church. Caleb and Ashley elope on the way to the rodeo. Mallory plays with tarot cards, telling the family what the cards mean.

=== Season 4 (2010–11) ===
No. overall	No. in season	Title	Directed by	Written by	Original release date	Prod. code
50	1	"Homecoming"	Grant Harvey	Heather Conkie	September 26, 2010	210631-1
Ty returns nine weeks overdue, bringing female friend Blair. Amy is jealous of the time they spend together, and being constantly reminded of this by Mallory. Ty seems oblivious, but becomes worried when he learns that Amy has been secretly working with Chase and his horses and that Chase was on the tour with her. Ty explains that he needed the extra time to find himself, but Jack says Ty let him down and made a mistake by bringing Blair. Chase's horse Simcoe kicks Jack, leading Amy and Ty to fight. Lisa invites Blair to ride in a cross-country race, causing further tensions with Amy who is also competing. Lou makes a surprise visit, and offers Amy advice. Amy tells Ty that she's upset about the time he's spending with Blair after being away for so long, and he finally gets it. Blair kisses Ty, saying that she has feelings for him but he doesn't reciprocate. Blair leaves with her boyfriend Grant. Caleb and Ashley return from the rodeo with bills to pay. Ashley is refused Val's help, and Caleb returns to his job at Heartland.
51	2	"What Dreams May Become"	Grant Harvey	Ken Craw	October 3, 2010	210631-2
Tim returns with his jockey, Janice. Scott asks Amy to assist with Nick Harwell's horse, while Scott and Ty care for the polo team's other horses. Harwell is reluctant to work with Amy, and she becomes suspicious. Janice suggests that his horse might be doped. Amy and Ty discover what Nick is giving the horses; they confront Nick's boss who threatens to fire Scott. Nick's team is far behind at halftime of the polo match, but his boss orders him to produce results. With stimulants, the team comes back, but Nick's horse goes wild in the stables, and they have to end the match. Nick apologizes to Amy and Lou. Lou hounds Jack about installing an automatic water system. Jack and Caleb try to install it themselves, but it doesn't go to plan. After a few plumbing issues, they get rid of it. Lou is disappointed when Tim closes the Dude Ranch. She admits to Amy that she isn't happy in Dubai, and she stays to manage the Dude Ranch since Tim shut it down after she left. Janice becomes upset when Tim announces that they are dating. Ty tells Amy that if he becomes a veterinarian, they could start their own business.
52	3	"Road Curves"	Dean Bennett	Heather Conkie	October 10, 2010	210631-3
Chase harasses Amy, pressuring her into doing a show. She flips back and forth, refusing then being goaded into agreeing, upsetting Ty. Amy and Chase perform the show and agree that they make a great team, and kiss. Amy tells Ty about the kiss and says that it doesn't change anything, not telling Ty she has feelings for Chase. Mrs. Bell is run off the road by Chase, injuring Sugarfoot. Ty promises to look after Sugarfoot's recovery and bring her to see him whenever she wants. Overhearing Ty's money concerns, Bell offers to become his honorary grandmother and help pay his veterinary school tuition. While in town, Bell identifies Chase as the one who ran her off the road, and Ty hits Chase for causing the accident and for messing with Amy. Lou brings Lisa to help clean the Dude Ranch, and Lisa offers to buy it. Lou confides to Amy her worries that Peter might think she is rejecting him. Caleb and Ashley invite Val to the trailer for her birthday dinner. Val accepts, but treats the couple poorly. Chase starts to flirt with Soraya.
53	4	"Graduation"	Dean Bennett	Mark Haroun	October 17, 2010	210631-4
Amy gets a full scholarship to Colorado State University, and Lou says she'd be ruining her life by not seizing the opportunity. Ty says that she has great options. Soraya begins dating Chase and Amy becomes jealous. Badger comes to work at Heartland, but is more worried about Mallory than work. Mallory questions why Badger didn't keep in touch and Ty challenges Badger to fight for Mallory so he hits Jake. During the graduation party, Jack finds Spartan fallen with colic (abdominal pain). Amy and Ty return to the ranch and Amy gets Spartan to stand so Scott can save him. Badger tells Mallory that his parents have started over without him. Ty has Badger and Mallory watch Spartan so Amy can return to the graduation to receive her diploma. Amy decides to take a gap year. Tim jeopardizes the Dude Ranch deal by overpricing it. Lou tells him to accept the offer, but is later hesitant to sign the papers. Lou confides her worries to Scott who says that she will always be an Alberta girl. Lisa offers Lou the chance to stay on as a partner in the Dude Ranch.
54	5	"Where the Truth Lies"	John Fawcett	Susin Nielsen	October 24, 2010	210631-5
Amy and Ty take in the horse and mule of Sarah, the town hermit. An abandoned horse Amy was working with instantly bonds with the mule. Medical tests suggest that Sarah's horse will have to be euthanized, but Amy tries a herbal remedy. Sarah's horse recovers, and she takes in the abandoned horse as well. Mallory's friend Jamie teaches Badger to ride so he can spend more time with Mallory (and so she can have Jake to herself). Mallory and Badger go to feed Sarah's chickens but fall down a well while looking for a horse Badger forgot to tie off. They find a skeleton and necklace in the shaft – it was Sarah's husband, who she thought had left her. Peter arrives to discover why Lou hasn't returned to Dubai. Lou and Lisa have different ideas about the Dude Ranch, and Jack asks Peter to help them with a business plan. They come to an understanding and plan to return to Dubai.
55	6	"Win, Place or Show"	John Fawcett	Leila Basen and David Preston	November 7, 2010	210631-6
Amy becomes exercise rider for Lightning Dexter while Janice works with a different horse and trainer, despite Tim's protests. He enters Dexter in a handicap race with Amy as his jockey, because Janice hurt his feelings. Nonetheless, Janice coaches Amy for the race. Amy feels enormous pressure from Tim but Ty encourages her to have fun and she rides a great race, showing with Janice winning, but afterwards Dexter comes up lame. Tim apologizes for how he treated Amy, who helps him understand how badly he treated Janice. Badger buys a decrepit old car to impress Mallory, and they get into trouble riding it. Ty discovers that the car is stolen and urges Badger to get rid of it before Jack finds out. Badger's attempt to ditch the car goes badly and Jack learns the truth. Lou trains Soraya to run the Dude Ranch. Lou takes Peter on a camping trip to get him away from work, and he gives her a big gift. Ashley takes more responsibility at Maggie's and gains the manager's spot, but Caleb spends money they don't have. Jake asks Jack to teach him to drive.
56	7	"Jackpot!"	T. W. Peacocke	Leila Basen and David Preston	November 14, 2010	210631-7
The Jackpot team roping competition is approaching, and Jake partners with Jamie. Caleb asks Kit to partner with him, not asking Amy thinking that she is too busy, but then drops Kit for another roper. Amy upset that Caleb didn't ask her teams up with Kit when she asked her, encouraged by Ty they beat Caleb. Tim worries about the cost of keeping Lightning Dexter when he can't race. He schemes to maneuver Lisa and her ex-husband into a bidding war for the horse by lying to both of them. Jack puts an end to it by making Tim an offer he can't refuse. To avoid moving, Ashley and Caleb try to raise money to buy the land their trailer is on. Val buys the land to ensure that Caleb can't shut her out of Ashley's life. Finding herself jealous of Jake and Jamie, Mallory tells Amy that she likes Jake more than her boyfriend Badger, which Badger overhears.
57	8	"One Day"	T. W. Peacocke	Mark Haroun	November 21, 2010	210631-8
Amy is offered a job teaching prisoners her style of breaking wild mustangs. Ty accompanies her for Jack's peace of mind, and recognizes a prisoner named Joe who had helped him in juvenile detention. Ty talks them into giving Joe a chance at training horses, but his first day goes poorly and he argues with Ty. Joe makes progress the next day, but sets the mustangs loose to cover his escape attempt. Ty chases Joe down and talks him into going back. Mallory learns that Badger is leaving. Jack asks him to stay on, and finds a visual arts school he might like. Badger, Mallory, Jake and Jamie pick berries for Mrs. Bell. Badger is stung by a bee and suffers an allergic reaction, and Jake saves him with an Epipen. Badger tells Jake that Mallory likes Jake more, and leaves Mallory with a kiss to remember him by. Val and Ashley's landlord-tenant relationship starts poorly, and an argument leads her to evict Ashley and Caleb. Caleb tries to smooth things over but Val would rather insult their marriage than support it.
58	9	"Local Hero"	Grant Harvey	Leila Basen and David Preston	December 5, 2010	4210631-9
Ty and Amy find a calf in the woods which leads them to Tim's stolen cattle. Jack talks Tim into going to the police, but Tim feels the police are not moving quickly enough and convinces the family to take action. During the cattle drive, they encounter the rustlers who shot Tim when they took the cattle. They ambush the rustlers and force them in the trailer for the police, and Tim has the family drive the cattle to the police station to tell them that he did their job for them. Even though Mallory is told to stay at the ranch, she doesn't listen and rides out to find the family. She finds the rustlers’ trailer, not knowing they are inside, and they force her to let them out and lock her inside. The police go to the rustlers’ trailer and find Mallory inside and take her back to Heartland. She tells Jack that everyone says she’s like part of the family, except when it’s really important, and asks Jack not to tell her parents, but he says he will not make that promise. Val tries to make peace by giving Ashley the land she lives on with Caleb, but demands that they sign a contract so that the land is in Ashley's name only. Caleb agrees, but as the paperwork is filed they discover that Ashley and Caleb are not legally married. Lou visits the family but is hiding something, and tells Amy that she will be staying for the long term. Chase asks Soraya to see him at a show, but she decides not to go because of school and finds out from Lou that there was something between Amy and Chase.
59	10	"Mood Swings"	Grant Harvey	Heather Conkie	January 2, 2011	210631-10
Grant comes to Heartland and beats up Ty for allegedly having sex with Blair, which Amy believes. Ty admits that Blair had kissed him, and Amy accuses him of encouraging Blair. Ty asks Amy if she encouraged Chase and has feelings for him. Lou tries to get Amy to be reasonable, but Amy points out Lou's marriage problems. Amy and Ty begin to reconcile, but Blair arrives and Mallory gossips, saying something more must have happened. Blair tells Amy she came on to Ty and it was her fault. Grant returns and makes up with Blair, but Amy and Ty break up over Amy's suspicions and her feelings for Chase. Caleb and Ashley try to adjust to the reality that they are not legally married while Val tries to come between them. Tim offers Caleb some advice, and Ashley asks Caleb to marry her. Val decides to back the couple, while Ty moves into their trailer. Lou offers to help Marnie with catering while she is pregnant. Mallory is mad that Jack told her parents about her misadventure.
60	11	"Family Business"	Francis Damberger	Ken Craw	January 9, 2011	210631-11
Tim is unhappy about Dexter's prospects and enters him in a claiming race, upsetting Amy. Amy asks about Ty but won't take his calls and refuses to get back together. Ty puts off his studies to drink and play pool. Chase announces that he is putting a claim on Dexter and will give him to Amy in exchange for a partnership. Soraya asks Amy about the expensive gift, and Amy says she is doing a clinic with Chase but withholds that she has feelings for Chase. Ty challenges Chase to a game of pool for $5000.00 and the right to put a claim on Dexter. Ty wins, but Chase puts in a claim regardless. Lou gives Tim a bill for Dexter's feed and boarding, forcing Tim to pull Dexter from the race. Ty gives half his winnings to Caleb and Ashley. Peter arrives to be with pregnant Lou but has a tough work schedule. Lou wants to turn her mother's room into a nursery, and Jack grudgingly agrees. Lou is upset when Peter has to return to Dubai. Mallory quits her job at Heartland and goes to work at Maggie's.
61	12	"Lost Song"	Francis Damberger	Heather Conkie	January 16, 2011	210631-12
Jack finds his wife Lyndy’s guitar and an unfinished song while he, Lou, and Caleb are clearing out Marion's closet. They also see an old trophy of Tim's that Caleb repairs. Jack upsets Lisa when he tells her that he is backing out of a trip to France with her. Val pressures Ashley to finalize her wedding plans. Ty, who is now best friends with Caleb, becomes best man, and Soraya and Amy are bridesmaids. At a stag party, Caleb tells Ty that he has to move out of the trailer. They get drunk and lose Tim's trophy in a bar fight. Ashley soon feels overwhelmed at the scale of the wedding; the couple confront Val who leaves them to be married at the trailer and gives them a honeymoon in Tuscany. Soraya apologizes to Amy about being jealous that Chase tried to buy Dexter for her; Amy still doesn't tell Soraya about her and Chase's feeling for each other. Amy is upset that Ty is in the wedding party and accuses him of being selfish and stupid but finds out he tried to use his own money to buy Dexter, and then gave some of it to Caleb and Ashley. She thanks him for this but doesn't have anything else to say to him. Jack dreams about Lyndy and finishes her song and performs it with Amy. Jack and Lisa make up after she hears the song.
62	13	"The Road Home"	Eleanore Lindo	Mark Haroun	January 23, 2011	210631-13
Amy begins training three horses for police use. Amy texts Ty to come to the house where he finds a box of the things he'd given her; he realizes that she is moving on. Amy asked Chase to work with her on the horses. Chase asks Amy to the movies with Soraya and himself, and then says Soraya cancelled. Chase talks about their feelings for each other, but Amy won't further betray Soraya and says they can't work together. Ty continues to miss school and tells Scott that he might quit. Jack tries to lift Ty's spirits, and they go on a motorcycle ride. At a fork in the road, they stop and Jack tells Ty: "If you don't show up at the ranch tomorrow morning, don't show up at all." Jack then speeds off without Ty. Ty rescues abandoned puppies and breaks into a clinic. The veterinarian sees Ty's intentions and offers him a job. One of the puppies dies and Ty calls Amy for support. She says that he always runs away, and he says she wanted him to leave. Amy tells Soraya about Chase and learns that Soraya never knew about the movies. In the morning, Ty moves into the loft and encourages Amy to get all three horses ready. Lou and Lisa disagree about how to run the Dude Ranch. Lou apologizes for the argument and asks Lisa to be her baby's godmother.
63	14	"Leap of Faith"	Eleanore Lindo	Andrew Wreggitt	February 13, 2011	210631-14
Chase convinces Amy to help Stuart Forest's daughter Riana with her horse, as it would be good publicity, though Amy thinks the horse is too much for the girl to handle. Riana fights Amy at every step while Stuart pushes Amy for progress, leading to putting himself in the middle. Ty tells Amy he doesn't like or trust Chase. Amy agrees to use Chase's bit and with Chase's encouragement an eager Riana has an accident, injuring horse and rider. Stuart decides to sue Heartland for negligence, threatening to ruin Amy. Chase denies any wrongdoing, while Ty tries to support Amy. Peter is preoccupied with work and Lou realizes that Bedford Oil is going bankrupt under lawsuits. After talking it over with Peter, Lou sends him back to Dubai to fight for his company. Amy keeps talking and working with Chase, which is hurting Soraya and Ty. Jack tries to persuade Mallory to come back to Heartland to care for Copper.
64	15	"The River"	Chris Potter	Leila Basen and David Preston	February 27, 2011	210631-15
Riana tells Stuart that she was trying to impress him and that it is his fault she cannot ride again. Amy trains colts for Chase, and blames everyone but Chase for the lawsuit. Chase agrees to help Amy with the lawsuit, but the following day he pulls all his horses from Heartland and says that he can't be in business with Amy. Chase and Soraya reconcile, and Chase tells Soraya that he did Amy a favour by pulling his horses so she wouldn't be overworked. Stuart files the lawsuit but Riana shows Lou that her horse has already recovered, and tells Stuart that she wants nothing to do with him. Amy realizes she should have not listened to Chase. Ty goes to support Amy and they kiss. While on a trail ride, Amy is thrown from her horse when a bear appears. Ty finds her in the woods and rescues her. Soraya breaks up with Chase for lying to her. Amy works with Riana and gets her to jumping again. Stuart watches and drops the lawsuit, admitting that he may have been the problem all along. Caleb returns from the honeymoon by himself, and worries that Ashley might never come back.
65	16	"Never Surrender"	Chris Potter	Story by : Will Pascoe; Teleplay by : Leila Basen, Ken Craw, Mark Haroun and David Preston	March 6, 2011	210631-16
Amy tells Ty that she only wants to work with horses that need her help. Caleb's friend Bryce, a paralyzed military veteran and former rodeo star, hires Amy to get his roping horse ready to sell. However, Amy sees an opportunity to re-train both horse and rider, though she needs help to convince Bryce that he can recapture his love for riding. Jack becomes hopeful when the Rodeo Hall of Fame contacts him, but they want him to speak at Tim's induction. Tim pesters Jack about his speech, but Jack misses the banquet when he has to take Lou to the hospital with false labour. Mallory is happier to be spending more time with Copper. Lou agrees to be Marnie's labour coach. Caleb wonders if Ashley likes Italy more than she likes him, though she calls to say she's coming home.
66	17	"Burning Down the House"	Dean Bennett	Leila Basen and David Preston	March 13, 2011	210631-17
Tim and Janice announce that they are selling Big River ranch and moving to California, causing issues with Amy and Lou. Miranda and her son Shane come to stay at Heartland. Amy quickly bonds with Shane over horses and father issues. Shane also bonds with Pal, a rescue horse that Amy brought to Heartland. Miranda tells Tim that Shane is his son, and a DNA test Tim demands proves this. Tim tells Janice about Shane. Amy lets Ty know she is still hung up on what happened with Blair. Caleb prepares a homecoming for Ashley which doesn't go as planned and he wonders if she fell in love with someone in Italy. She quits her job, and with her mother pushing her, she goes back to school, leaving Caleb with a difficult choice. Peter's company is dissolved, and he has difficulty dealing with the loss and what he should do next.
67	18	"Passages"	Dean Bennett	Heather Conkie	March 27, 2011	210631-18
Lisa brings a pair of Clydesdales for Amy to train for sleigh pulling, and Amy asks Ty to help. She confronts Ty over a text message from Blair. Mrs. Bell visits and encourages Ty to work and fight for what's important to him. Amy gets upset at Ty when he tries to help with the horses. Ty tells Amy that they don't have anything if they can't trust each other, but she can't help her feelings. Amy later admits that they broke up because of her feelings for Chase. Tim delays his move despite Janice waiting for him in California. He asks Miranda to stay while he tries to make a connection with Shane. Tim later confronts Miranda, thinking that she's after his money, and tells Jack about Shane. Mallory is fired from Maggie's and returns to help at Heartland with imperfect results. Lou experiences discomfort in the last weeks of her pregnancy. She goes into labour and the baby is delivered at the ranch by Ty and Amy, who bond over the experience. Caleb and Val argue about her plans for Ashley, which become clearer after Caleb agrees to move closer to her school.

=== Television film (2010) ===
The film aired on CBC Television in Canada and the Hallmark Channel in the US (instead of UP TV, which did not air it until a few years later).

Title	Directed by	Written by	Original release date	Prod. code	Viewers (millions)
"A Heartland Christmas"	Dean Bennett	Heather Conkie	December 12, 2010	245278-19	1.40
Amy and Ty race to save starving horses trapped in a mountain avalanche during Christmas. It is taking longer to save the horses, so Jack and Tim go to bring Amy home, but she refuses and they stay to help. They find the horses belong to Will Vernon, Jack’s old rodeo friend. Lou stresses about how Peter and the rest of the family won't make it back in time for Christmas, while she is stuck looking after Christmas-obsessed Mallory. Jack helps Will overcome his guilt from an avalanche that he survived but killed his son-in-law years before. While Ty and Amy lead the way in getting the horses out, Will reconciles with his daughter Joanne and Steven, his grandson. Everybody makes it to Heartland for Christmas, including Mallory's parents who make the flight through the storm.

=== Season 5 (2011–12) ===
No. overall	No. in season	Title	Directed by	Written by	Original release date	Prod. code
68	1	"Finding Freedom"	John Fawcett	Heather Conkie	September 18, 2011	211675-1
Amy is inspired to take her horsemanship to a new level when she works with Renard, a professional liberty horse trainer (one who trains horses without tack). Shane runs away to Hudson, and Ty brings him to the ranch. Shane asks to see Pal, but the rescue horse has been re-homed, and Amy asks Shane why he ran away. Tim makes a trade to get Pal back for Shane, and continues to hide from Amy and Lou that Shane is their half-brother. Ty seeks to rent Caleb's trailer to be more responsible and to have a place to take Amy. Amy becomes upset that Ty is moving out, but he helps her see the good that can come from it. Amy questions Ty about their relationship, which he doesn't want to label. Ty helps Amy find the perfect spot to train Spartan, and she makes progress with Renard's advice. Mallory wants to go to the spring formal dance and tells Jake that they are going, but it is not a date.
69	2	"Something in the Night"	John Fawcett	David Preston	September 25, 2011	211675-2
Janice returns with a new racehorse, Cisco, and resumes her relationship with Tim. Janice and Amy come into conflict over training Cisco, so Amy takes the horse to Heartland and Cisco improves. Jack takes Tim to Moose Jaw to make arrangements with Miranda. It doesn't go well, but Jack smooths it out the following day. Mallory's bad advice causes Amy to worry about Ty’s moving out. A family of raccoons move into the trailer. Ty invites Amy to dinner at his place, but his plans go awry when a raccoon makes itself at home. Ty thinks of something else he and Amy enjoy, and they later take the raccoons to a new home. Mallory seeks sympathy for messing up with Jake.
70	3	"What's in a Name?"	Grant Harvey	Leia Basen	October 2, 2011	211675-3
Lou panics as the family gathers for her baby's naming ceremony. Jack is struggling to fix the fireplace, and she fears Peter's parents don't like her. Lou talks with Peter's mother and finds that she really likes her and that her family also has issues. Peter's father helps Jack repair the fireplace. Miranda and Shane unexpectedly arrive, and Shane is convinced that Tim is going to propose to Miranda. Tim and Miranda decide to tell Shane that Tim is his father, but Tim accidentally reveals it at the family dinner, and Shane storms out. Amy finds Shane and talks to him with Ty, but it doesn't go so well when Tim tries talking with him. Shane tells his mother that he wants to go home, but Lou stops them because they're part of the family, and she needs the whole family to help prepare for the naming ceremony. Lou and Amy have Shane pick a stone for the fireplace, to permanently include him. Cisco's training continues to make progress, though Amy and Janice see things differently. Scott gives Ty a chance to earn some money.
71	4	"Beyond Hell's Half Mile"	Grant Harvey	Ken Craw	October 16, 2011	211675-4
Amy begins working with a chuck wagon team, thinking that there is an issue with a lead horse. Amy is not able to look at the horse until the owners son sneaks it over to Heartland for her. Amy doesn't find anything wrong with the horse, which leave her to think that the problem might be the driver/owner. Amy confronts the driver/ owner about his eyesight which he says isn't a problem. After an accident at practice, the driver gives his position to his son for the season. The family is losing sleep due to the new baby, Katie. Lou and Peter have differing views on how to handle Katie's sleeping. Mallory gets a book from a baby sleep doctor which recommends what Lou wanted to do. Katie learns to put herself back to sleep. Caleb returns home saying that he and Ashley are on a break, and admits to Ty that he misses Ashley but that their marriage might be over.
72	5	"Never Let Go"	Dean Bennett	Ken Craw	October 23, 2011	211675-5
Amy works with Chaplin, which she believes might be a trick riding horse. Sandra, the owner, won't talk about it, though Amy learns from Sandra's mother that Sandra hasn't ridden since her sister and riding partner died in a wreck. Angry that Amy spoke with her mother, Sandra retrieves Chaplin but brings him back to get in shape for sale. Amy convinces Sandra that she is the perfect owner for Chaplin and to not sell him. Caleb says that he and Ashley are separated, and Amy and Ty try to cheer him up. Soraya returns from London and Caleb starts to take an interest in her, which becomes awkward for them. Ty finds Caleb passed-out drunk in the barn. With the house being overcrowded, Jack builds an outhouse to accommodate. Lou and Peter decide to build a house at Heartland. Mallory convinces them to have a date night while she babysits, it goes badly.
73	6	"The Slippery Slope"	Dean Bennett	Heather Conkie	October 30, 2011	211675-6
Jack's doesn't want a birthday celebration. He learns that one of his old bandmates has died. Lisa and Lou get Jack's band back together for a reunion party. It upsets Jack but his cancer-stricken buddy Eli gets Jack to see how good it could be for him. Jack and the band get on stage for one last set. Amy's new client is Kelly, a girl Caleb met at a bar. Amy hasn't made much progress with the horse when Kelly comes to check. Caleb flirts with Kelly and brings a mechanical bull for her to try, telling her that she could make it on the rodeo circuit. Amy feels that she needs to work to hold Ty's interest and rides the mechanical bull at the party. Ty tells her that she is amazing at whatever she does. Caleb asks Kelly to dance and wants to spend time together and get to know her, however Kelly tells him she doesn't date married men. Mallory gives her number to Austin, the new busboy at Maggie's. Austin invites himself to the party but is more interested in her father, being one of his biggest fans. Amy and Spartan show Jack a birthday present.
74	7	"Over the Rise"	Tina Grewal	Ken Craw	November 13, 2011	211675-7
Shane comes to stay for the summer and Tim tries to improve their relationship, taking Shane to an old Western movie set with Amy and Lou. Tim takes the longer and more dangerous way to the movie set, using most of the day. Lou keeps trying to get in touch with Mallory, who is babysitting Katie, and who leaves several emotional messages on a nanny cam she discovers. Tim fools around and locks Shane in a jail cell, and Tim hurts himself trying to get Shane out. Tim asks Amy about how she bonded with Shane, and she explains that when she was his age she didn't know her father either. Tim's injury forces the group to stay overnight, upsetting Lou and Amy, and the caretaker catches them for trespassing. They bring Tim home on a travois since he is unable to ride. Lou runs to see Katie and tells Mallory that the camera was a gift and she would never use it, and Mallory takes the camera to erase the recordings. Tim gets Shane a steer to practice roping. Caleb decides to try bull riding but his training doesn't go well. Ty builds a motorized bathtub for a rodeo clown. Caleb wrecks it, and Ty and Jack make a creative fix. Caleb gets on his first bull with satisfactory results.
75	8	"Nothing for Granted"	Tina Grewal	Mark Haroun	November 20, 2011	211675-8
Ty visits Mrs. Bell but finds that she's been moved into a retirement home to her dislike. Ty cares for Sugarfoot and brings the pony to visit Bell but problems arise. Ty schemes to sneak Bell out for a day, and the whole family gets her place in shape. When they return her to the home, the nurse says they are going to evict her, which overjoys Bell. Mrs. Bell tell Ty she couldn't afford his tuition and he discovers that it was paid by Wade. Shane is rude to Janice. Tim creates Team Cisco to get Shane involved, but Janice and Tim argue over Shane accompanying them to the first race. Janice tells Shane that he needs to get to know Cisco better. Lou meets with an old friend and takes the job he is offering. After finding out Pete was passed over for the job she talks to him but only makes things worse. Lou makes a lunch at their building site on the Dude Ranch. Soraya decides to go to London to be with her boyfriend after talking to Caleb. Mallory realizes that Austin isn't that interested in her, and creatively breaks up with him.
76	9	"Cover Me"	Grant Harvey	Leila Basen & David Preston	December 4, 2011	211675-9
Ty returns the tuition money to Wade, wanting nothing to do with him. Tim and Shane bond while working with Cisco, but Cisco is stolen with a trailer of horses. Liam says that Wade works for the company that hauled the trailer. Tim being a jerk accuses Ty of knowing what's going on. With information from Wade, Ty and Amy sneak into an off-track race site, where they find Cisco. When Cisco is called to post, Ty knocks-out Liam and Amy rides Cisco in the race. Cisco wins, and with Shane and Wade's help they save the horse. Tim blames Ty and Amy for endangering Shane after he snuck in the truck. Ty wonders what his deal with Wade will ultimately cost. Katie says her first word, "Dada", while Lou is at work, and Peter conceals this. However, Lou becomes concerned that Katie is behind in her development. Katie later says "Mama" in front of Lou. Peter becomes general contractor for their home construction, with Caleb helping. Kelly avoids Caleb because he is married but gives him a chance after learning of his situation. Caleb prepares to go out with Kelly when he gets a call from Ashley.
77	10	"Trust"	Grant Harvey	Heather Conkie	January 8, 2012	211675-10
Amy has nightmares about a horse Caleb euthanized and works with the surviving rescue horse, Alcatraz. Scott and Ty are concerned that Alcatraz is dangerous though Amy likens him to an untrained Spartan. Alcatraz attacks Amy in the stables and Jack wants the horse sent away while Ty tells her that her nightmares are affecting her. Amy has a small breakthrough with Alcatraz while Ty watches. Peter wants to excavate for the house foundation but it might upset a months of Dude Ranch bookings. Jack tells Lou that she has to let Peter work, whether with the construction or another job. Lisa becomes upset about the build, and asks Peter and Lou to buy her out of the Dude Ranch. Jack, who is concerned about Lisa kissing her ex-husband, becomes involved and Lisa kisses him passionately. Jack apologizes, and Peter receives a job offer in Vancouver. Tim helps Shane with roping; Miranda sees social media video of what Shane did helping save Cisco and comes to take him home, but Tim doesn't see anything wrong. Tim tells Shane that he can come back, but Miranda says she doesn't want them to have any further contact.
78	11	"Fool's Gold"	Dean Bennett	Mark Haroun	January 15, 2012	211675-18
Ty makes dinner for Lily and Amy, and his mother tells him that his father has died. Amy consoles Ty and spends the night in his bed. Amy keeps Lily company and they work with Alcatraz while Ty spends the day working on a shed, avoiding everyone. Lily reminisces about Ty's father and tells Ty that he needs to forgive him. Amy spends more time working with Alcatraz, saying she doesn't know how to help Ty. Ty eventually breaks down at the trailer, holding the fool's gold that his father gave him. Ty and Lily meet to talk about his father and spreading his father's ashes, but Ty doesn't approve of Lily being together with Wade. Mallory is mad that Lou returns late without calling, and to prove a point, she leaves Lou without a babysitter on no notice. Lou is forced to have her business meeting at Heartland and forgets she left her baby monitor on. Although she sent Jack away, Lou sees that he might be able to save her meeting.
79	12	"Road to Nowhere"	Dean Bennett	Ken Craw	January 22, 2012	211675-11
Ty makes sure that Amy is all right before he rides alone to Eagle Lake to spread his father's ashes. Amy worries but doesn't go after him and sends Jack after him. Ty gets upset with Jack but they later apologize to each other. Ty explains his mixed feelings and Jack talks about what happened with his own father. The next day, they spread the ashes and head home. Bryce asks Amy to his ranch, where he is working with other injured riders and needs another horse. Amy shows Bryce some horses and he sets his mind on Alcatraz though Amy refuses to sell him. Soraya misunderstands when Bryce asks for advice with Amy, thinking that he has romantic intentions. Amy and Lou have a girls' night out. Amy catches Bryce working with Alcatraz at Heartland and gets upset but realizes he might have been right all along. Bryce has some fun at Soraya's expense before she leaves for London. Austin tries to apologize to Mallory but has a hose turned on him. Mallory sneaks him into the ranch house and hears the song he wrote for her. Lou is upset when she catches Austin.
80	13	"Aftermath"	Chris Potter	Leila Basen	February 12, 2012	211675-12
Ty is badly injured in a motorcycle crash while returning from Eagle Lake with Jack. Ty has hallucinations of Amy, while Amy sees Ghost and fears something has happened to Ty. Tim mocks Amy for it, and Lou only wants to talk about herself. Ty wanders off with a concussion, and Jack finds a hunter who helps him track Ty and get him to an ambulance, where he keeps asking about Amy. Amy sees Ghost again but doesn't mention it. Tim is preoccupied with his custody case for Shane and asks Amy to spy and say that Miranda is an unfit mother. After discussing it with Lou, Amy tells Tim that she won't tear down Miranda. Tim explains that he's desperate to make up for his past. Lou is stressed from working at home. Lou and Peter are each offered promotions, and Peter expects that Lou will quit. However, they overcome their issues and both continue working. The hunter returns the wrecked motorcycles to Heartland, thinking Ty is Jack's son, making Tim jealous. While Ty recuperates in the loft, Amy holds up her left hand, telling Ty that she is wearing the promise ring again.
81	14	"Working on a Dream"	Chris Potter	David Preston	February 26, 2012	211675-13
Tim tries to improve his image by volunteering for the Little Britches rodeo and running for president of the Cowboy Association. Amy goes to help Tim with the rodeo but does all the work while Tim focuses on campaigning for the election. Tim arranges to be interviewed for a newspaper, but Amy is interviewed in his absence. Tim subsequently blames Amy for making him look like a fake. Tim loses the election by a wide margin and is fired from the rodeo. Ty moves back to the trailer, saying that he is healed and wants to fix his motorcycle. Caleb comes home having failed to reconnect with Ashley. Ty pushes Amy away, but Caleb tells Amy that Ty needs her. Amy asks Jack to intervene when Ty won't ride his repaired motorcycle. Jack helps Ty get back in the saddle, and Ty starts teaching Amy how to ride. Lou and Peter's house is being built which causes issues with Lisa and the Dude Ranch. Jack gets caught in the middle of the conflict and creates his own problems with Lisa. After treating Lisa poorly about the Dude Ranch, Lou and Peter decide to buy a house rather than build one on the Dude Ranch site.
82	15	"Breaking Down and Building Up"	Grant Harvey	Heather Conkie	March 4, 2012	211675-14
Amy gets a call from Mr. Hanley and discovers him dead in a field the following day. Amy wants to care for Hanley's horses but Tim refuses to help. Amy and Ty go to get them but the animals are to be auctioned along with the foreclosed property. Amy talks Jack into buying the horses to save them from the slaughterhouse. Amy takes in Hanley's dog and renames it Lobo. Peter and Lou are looking for a new home but Lou's high standards cause the search to lengthen. Lou starts bidding on Hanley's ranch though Peter doesn't think the house is any good. Mallory talks Mrs. Bell into bidding, unaware that she's bidding against Lou. After winning, Bell offers to sell the ranch to Lou and Peter. Tim makes a mess of his custody case and with his family, causing issues with Lou and Amy. Tim asks Janice to marry him but she leaves him when she learns it is only a scheme to help his custody case.
83	16	"Wild Horses"	Grant Harvey	Jessalyn Coombe & Andrew Wreggitt	March 11, 2012	211675-15
Scott is asked by April, a woman from his past, to return to his reservation and vaccinate a herd of band horses which are in danger of being culled due to risk of EHV-1 infection (which they could transmit over a wide area). Amy and Ty assist, and Scott explains that his grandfather once oversaw the herd. Their first attempt to catch the herd goes poorly, but Amy devises a plan to use a captured foal to lure the herd back. They get close to the herd but gunfire spooks them. Scott confronts Don, a rancher who had lost three horses and is in favour of the cull, to not do it again. Amy's plan then works: the whole herd is fully inoculated and the cull is cancelled. Tim begins drinking again after ruining things with Janice and the custody case. Caleb knocks-out Tim for his abusive behaviour. Jack confronts Tim about how he is sabotaging his life. Mallory plans a huge sweet sixteen party for herself but cancels it when she learns her family are moving to Nashville. She feels sorry for herself and how she messed things up, but Jake gives her a cupcake for her birthday.
84	17	"True Calling"	Dean Bennett	Mark Haroun	March 18, 2012	211675-16
Jack asks Miranda to talk with Tim since he is drinking again. She confronts Tim at Heartland but he yells at her, and Jack warns Tim that he could lose his daughters along with Shane. Lou confronts Tim and bans him from seeing Katie. When Amy learns that Tim is drinking, she gives her father a hug and tells him that she loves him. Tim sits and talks with Miranda about Shane and how to handle everything. He quits drinking. Amy encourages Ty to finish his veterinary school applications. Amy finds Lobo with a gunshot wound (mistaken for a wolf) and rushes him to Ty at the clinic. Lobo deteriorates and Ty must deal with it in the veterinarian's absence. With Amy's help, Ty saves Lobo's life, and the on-call veterinarian tells him that he did the right thing. Ty mails his applications. Mallory raises money for an apartment so she can stay in Hudson. She steals one of her father's guitars and sells it but the cheque bounces. Jake gets the guitar back but Jack makes Mallory tell her parents the truth. Mallory leaves for Nashville without saying goodbye.
85	18	"Candles in the Wind"	Dean Bennett	Heather Conkie	March 25, 2012	211675-17
Renard sends Amy a horse named Zephyr with a riddle to solve. Amy works Spartan and Zephyr together and makes great progress. Renard offers her an audition for his travelling show, Dark Horse. Amy does well and is offered a two-year contract but turns it down to continue helping horses that need her. Ty purchases an engagement ring but has trouble finding the right moment because Amy does not want change. Ty ask Jack's permission to marry Amy, which Lou overhears. Ty is about to propose when Amy says they shouldn't ever stand in each other's way. While Ty recovers, Amy finds the ring and looks unenthused. Shane arrives at Heartland and Ty advises him to tell his parents what he wants. Tim and Miranda call off their lawyers and settle things themselves, keeping in mind what Shane wants. Tim, Miranda, and Shane spend time together as a family, and it is decided to let Shane go between them without a set schedule. Peter drives Lou crazy making plans for their second anniversary. He sets up a beautiful evening for them at the Dude Ranch. Jack decides to go to Paris to be with Lisa.

=== Season 6 (2012–13) ===
No. overall	No. in season	Title	Directed by	Written by	Original release date	Prod. code
86	1	"Running Against the Wind"	Stefan Scaini	Heather Conkie	September 16, 2012	228108-1
A runaway horse appears at Heartland; Amy names him Phoenix Rising and starts training him as a jumper. Amy becomes anxious that Ty hasn't proposed and talks to Lou, who goes to the trailer and tells Ty that Amy is ready, and he should stop waiting. The heater in the trailer breaks, and Ty moves back to the loft temporarily. Before leaving for a date with Amy, Ty discovers that the ring he bought is missing. Ty finds Georgie, a runaway, in the loft and catches her by force. Clint comes the next morning to return Georgie to her foster home, but she jumps out of the car, and Amy catches her. Georgie forms a bond with Phoenix, and Jack offers to keep her for a while when a problem develops with her foster family. Georgie returns Ty's ring to Amy, who is caught putting it back in the loft. Lou and Peter's home renovations are three months behind schedule and going from bad to worse, stressing them both. Tim has an idea to make some quick money with the Buff Burgers franchise, but no one wants to join him.
87	2	"Crossed Signals"	Stefan Scaini	Heather Conkie	September 23, 2012	228108-2
Ty is surprised that Amy knew he had been trying to propose for four months. Amy yells at him, and then apologizes for being unfair. Her frustrations come out at Lou and Jack. Tim is hurt that Ty didn't ask his blessing and says "no" out of spite, though he later gives Ty his approval. Ty explains to Amy why he didn't propose that night because of what she said. Ty proposes in the loft and is devastated when Amy says it isn't special enough and walks away laughing. Ty moves back to the trailer. Phoenix's owner Kendra visits to claim him. Georgie sneaks into the horse trailer with Phoenix and sees the horrible condition of Kendra's barn. Amy goes over into Kendra's barn and confronts her about it. Phoenix escapes again and returns to Heartland. Kendra is recently widowed and asks for help in return for ownership of Phoenix, which thrills Georgie. Jack agrees to continue fostering Georgie. Lou blames Lobo for giving Katie fleas, but she actually has lice from daycare. Lou goes overboard with the lice, and Jack saves them by babysitting.
88	3	"Keeping Up Appearances"	Dean Bennett	Ken Craw	September 30, 2012	228108-3
Tim sees an opportunity to make money from a weekend cowboy. Tim sells Dexter to the cowboy for a hefty sum and takes a commission to help him buy a ranch. Amy learns that the cowboy's wife doesn't know how to ride and tells her to admit it to her husband and that Dexter isn't a beginner's horse. After realizing what she's up against, she begins taking riding lessons from Amy. Lou obtains the cowboy's financial accounts and shows him how much better she could manage things for him, getting his business but costing Tim his commission. Amy keeps asking Ty if they're all right. Between this and final examinations, Ty is overstressed and makes a mistake at work. Ty thinks he's being fired when Scott suddenly hires veterinary assistant Cassandra. Ty tells Amy that she needs to let it go. Lisa returns from France and is curious about Georgie who keeps monopolizing Jack's time. Georgie has a school issue that she makes worse. Mallory returns two weeks early and has her surprise dinner ruined because Tim is feeling sorry about being bested by both of his daughters. Mallory apologizes for treating Jake poorly.
89	4	"The Natural"	Dean Bennett	Leila Basen	October 7, 2012	228108-4
Mallory clashes with Georgie and is upset when Georgie shows an interest in horse jumping. Amy starts training Mallory at jumping but her commitment is lacking while Georgie is a fearless natural. Georgie finds the jumping course Ty built and starts practicing there with Phoenix. Amy is amazed at Georgie's talent. Mallory is discouraged but Amy won't let her quit. Lisa puts pictures from France on a digital picture frame, which Jack doesn't take to. Tim hopes to make some money breeding buffalo and gets Jack involved. Miranda arrives to talk with Tim about Shane; they grow closer on a trail ride. Tim admits to Jack that he failed to get the buffalo tested after it turns out to be sterile and that he's seeing Miranda. Tim advises Jack to lie and say that he loved the trip to France. Ty ask Amy to help him study but it doesn't go well, Cassandra takes her place and Amy gets jealous. Peter is upset that Lou's work is taking her to New York for a month; they have a good talk and come to an understanding. Caleb is more interested in helping Lou than doing his job.
90	5	"Trial Run"	Grant Harvey	David Preston	October 28, 2012	228108-5
Janice asks Amy for advice on Cisco's performance. Tim thinks it is about his share but Janice says she does not want his money. Amy suspects that Janice is the problem and suggests that Janice may be sabotaging Cisco because she doesn't want a horse Tim owns to win. Amy criticizes Tim for how badly he treated Janice, so Tim gives Janice full ownership of Cisco. Jack puts Mallory on disciplinary probation for her neglectful attitude at work. She continues to fight with Georgie and follows Georgie, who has been feeding a stray dog, and finds the dog in a well. Mallory botches a rescue attempt, trapping Georgie and the dog in the well while losing both of their horses. Jack is concerned when the riderless horses return, rescues the girls from the well, and has a talk with Georgie. Amy and Ty rush the injured dog to the clinic, where Amy feels unneeded as Ty and Cassandra treat it. Earlier, Amy felt jealous of Cassandra because she found out first about Ty getting on the University of Saskatchewan veterinary school wait list, so he makes sure to have Amy open a letter from the University of Calgary.
91	6	"Helping Hands"	Grant Harvey	Mark Haroun	November 4, 2012	228108-6
Scott and Ty notice issues with Buckingham but the horse's owner, Jeremy Hughes, seems indifferent. Amy wants to help, but Ty tells her Jeremy is not a good person and should be avoided. Without Ty's knowledge, Amy agrees to meet with Jeremy and then cancels. Jeremy later comes to Heartland and Amy agrees to work together, which they treat more as a date. Ty sees them together and becomes upset and runs Jeremy off. Amy finds Jeremy to find out why he won't treat Buckingham. Amy tells Ty that she wants to work with Buckingham, and he warns her to not trust him. Amy brings Jeremy to coach Mallory after Mallory fired her. Georgie leaves the back gate open, and Mallory helps her retrieve the horses. They bond while finding one missing horse, and Mallory takes the blame to protect Georgie. Lisa keeps pressuring Jack to buy a place in France. Jack tells Lisa that he didn't enjoy the trip to France or the people he met there, causing a fight. Lisa tells Jack they need to figure out their relationship; they decide to take a break.
92	7	"Life is a Highway"	Jim Donovan	Leila Basen	November 11, 2012	228108-7
Chase returns to Hudson and Amy seems disappointed that he has married. Chase talks Amy into giving his wife Hayley liberty riding lessons; they reminisce about being together. Hayley's first lesson goes badly when Chase is more interested in working with Amy, upsetting Hayley and Ty. Amy tells Chase she shouldn't work with Hayley; Chase then tells Hayley that it's because Amy is attracted to him. When Chase returns for Hayley's horse, he kisses Amy but she slaps him. Hayley comes to talk to Amy, Amy supports what Chase wants for their future. Later, Amy starts to tell Ty about the kiss and he tells her he saw it. Lou returns from New York and discovers her supervisor has been taking credit for her work, Tim gets involved making it worse. Lou quits her job, while her blog starts getting attention. Caleb comes home to find Ty on a rent strike because the trailer is falling apart. Lou starts to confide in Caleb, after he asked for a loan for tires. Jack prepares Georgie for her first cattle drive. She hints that Jack would be a good foster parent.
93	8	"Do the Right Thing"	Jim Donovan	Mark Haroun	December 2, 2012	228108-8
Ty cannot afford truck repairs and reluctantly turns to Wade. Wade takes Ty to a friend's junkyard for parts but the junkyard dog chases them and traps them inside a car. With time to talk, they come to an understanding and discover that they each had rejected proposals. Ty decides not to stand between Wade and Lily. Amy tries to help Bugg, a miniature chuck wagon horse that is not taking direction. Georgie is hurt riding without permission and Bugg comes to help her. Amy tells Bugg's owner that Bugg could be a great guide animal. Mallory plans a party for Ty's acceptance to veterinary school. Georgie catches a mistake with his cake but Mallory won't listen. When Lou checks on them, Georgie has fixed the cake and gotten things the way Lou wanted. Ty lets the family know he appreciates everything they've done for him. Lou is hired by Lisa's ex-husband Dan, who implies that he and Lisa have reconciled. Tim breaks the news to Jack. Jack says that he doesn't care but Lou doesn't need his business. Amy realizes she made a big mistake by asking Ty to wait, and doesn't even know why she is waiting.
94	9	"Great Expectations"	Dean Bennett	Heather Conkie	December 9, 2012	228108-9
Jack, Georgie, Ty and Amy are supposed to go set up Stumpy's fishing camp for Stumpy's family reunion but Jack and Georgie can't go as Clint comes to Heartland to interview the family about Jack becoming Georgie's foster parent. Ty and Amy concede to go alone. They find a wild foal caught in a trapper's snare, and they take care of its wounds. Amy makes a poultice for it and the mare comes to the coral to feed it. After a walk along a river, Ty proposes to Amy and she accepts. Everything goes wrong at Heartland: Tim misspeaks then makes it worse, Lou and Peter freak out about Katie being sick, Georgie complains about missing the trip and confesses to all the things she did wrong. Lisa arrives and tells Jack that she isn't back with Dan. Georgie overhears Clint saying that it doesn't look good, Georgie decides to run away and she becomes trapped in the barn fire at Peter and Lou's ranch.
95	10	"The Road Ahead"	Dean Bennett	Heather Cookie	January 6, 2013	228108-10
Jack saves Georgie while Peter saves Phoenix who runs away from the barn fire at Lou and Peter's place. Georgie feels guilty for endangering Phoenix, and is too upset to speak to Jack. Phoenix returns in the morning but leaves as Georgie runs toward him. Georgie is worried that Phoenix hates her though Amy works with them to rebuild trust. Clint tells Jack that he was rejected as a foster parent, with his advanced age being the deciding factor, and that Georgie will have to be moved to another home. Lou and Tim realize that they affected Jack's chances. Lou overhears Georgie say that Heartland is the only place she wants to live. Tim talks to Clint, causing more problems. Peter is relieved that their insurance will cover the fire, angering Lou due to the other issues. Lou and Peter decide to become Georgie's foster parents and start the process of adopting her. With Georgie's fate more certain, Ty and Amy tell everyone of their engagement. Lisa talks with Jack and returns to France.
96	11	"Blowing Smoke"	T. W. Peacocke	Ken Craw	January 13, 2013	228108-11
Amy notices that Buckingham is limping; Jeremy blames Ty. Scott says the horse either needs surgery or should be retired. Amy and Cassandra disagree about surgery being in the horse's best interests. Jeremy uses Mallory's crush on him to ride Phoenix after seeing him jump a fence, telling her it is to protect Buckingham, but Amy catches them and stops him. Jeremy asks to use Phoenix for the rest of the season, and Amy considers it, against everyone's advice. Amy goes to Ty's party with classmates. Jeremy, who's there with Cassandra, gets Amy drunk and gets her to agree to let him use Phoenix. Next day Amy changes her mind, and it upsets Mallory. Georgie wants to turn the yard cart into a chariot and tries to get Caleb to help. Jack suggests that Lou help to bond with Georgie, and Lou solves the design problems. The chariot works, and Georgie decides to go to a baby shower with Lou and Katie. Lou starts confiding to Caleb about her marriage. Ty tells him not to get involved, but Caleb sucker punches Peter in front of Lou.
97	12	"Playing With Fire"	T. W. Peacocke	David Preston	January 20, 2013	228108-12
Jeremy uses Mallory's crush on him to guilt Amy into allowing him to coach her at Heartland. Ty lets Amy know he is against it and doesn't trust Jeremy. Amy has difficulty coaching Georgie, whose attitude is bad, but Ty provides helpful advice. Georgie is bullied by Olivia, a classmate from school at Maggie's. Lou talks Amy into letting Georgie enter a riding competition, but only if she listens to Amy's coaching. Peter helps Jack with the yard when Caleb doesn't come to work and tells Jack what happened between them. Lou asks Ty to talk to Caleb instead of dealing with it herself. Lou admits to Peter she confided to Caleb about their marriage because he is never there; Caleb apologizes to Peter and lets him punch him to settle things. The Hillhurst show is canceled, so Lou hosts a show in its place instead of working on her marriage. Georgie comes in second, but when Mallory sees Jeremy kissing Cassandra before her ride, she loses focus and after a jump Spartan is injured.
98	13	"Waiting for Tomorrow"	Chris Potter	Leila Basen	February 10, 2013	228108-13
Ty's quick actions give Spartan a chance at recovery. Amy blames herself for what happened and Jack tells her things just happen sometimes. Scott tells Amy the leg is broken; Amy decides to get the surgery for Spartan after talking with Ty and Scott. Jack and Tim sell part of their cattle herd to cover the bill. Amy is able to calm Spartan as he wakes from surgery. Mallory feels she caused Spartan's injury and is comforted by Jake. She apologizes to Amy and Spartan but Amy tells her it was just an accident, and that Jeremy fooled Mallory into thinking he was a nice person. Georgie is worried and doesn't want to let Phoenix jump again. Lou shows Georgie that she can't just stop Phoenix from doing what he loves. With Lou's help, Georgie gets on Phoenix and jumps him again. Amy thanks Jack for paying for Spartan's surgery.
99	14	"Lost and Gone Forever"	Chris Potter	David Preston	February 17, 2013	228108-14
Spartan is healing and should be released from the clinic in a week. Buckingham is scheduled for surgery and Amy talks to Jeremy, against Ty's warning. Jeremy blames her for not letting him ride Phoenix. Cassandra later informs Ty that Buckingham has died, and a post-mortem test shows he was overdosed. Caleb helps Georgie learn how to play a recorder for her music class, and she receives bribes from both Jack and Lou to practice. Jeremy blames Ty for Buckingham's death, and Ty feels guilty because he was the last to give Buckingham a shot. Scott has to fire Ty for the clinic's insurance. Mallory states to Amy that Jeremy had been lying. Ty figures out Jeremy was in the clinic that night and further questions Cassandra about Buckingham's death. Amy and Ty figure out Jeremy has over-insured Buckingham, and Ty confronts Jeremy. Ty returns to work at Heartland. Georgie is excited to get another recorder. Caleb is back working at Heartland and still pays too much attention to Lou; he gives Lou a kiss before leaving for the rodeo circuit.
100	15	"After All We've Been Through"	Stephen Reynolds	Mark Haroun	March 3, 2013	228108-15
Ty defends Cassandra to Amy, who thinks Cass is acting suspiciously. Georgie is away on a school camping trip. Amy is excited when Spartan returns, but Spartan doesn't want to leave the barn. Amy worries about his uneasiness from the trauma of the accident and surgery. Lou and Peter's romantic weekend is ruined by Peter's ex-wife Eden. Ty is called to fix Eden's car and suggests she stay at the Dude Ranch. Lou sees Peter and Eden together and is concerned, but Peter tells Lou their dog Max is very sick; Lou offers to go to the vet to support Peter and Eden. Mallory creates a dating profile for Jack that later backfires badly. Ty breaks into Jeremy's trailer to search for evidence on his computer. Ty tells Scott that Jeremy took out a large policy on his horse, but Scott doesn't condone how Ty got the evidence. Jeremy breaks into Ty's trailer to retrieve his things. Cassandra confesses to Scott that Jeremy was at the clinic before Buckingham's death. Jeremy suddenly leaves town, making himself look bad. Ty gets his job back at the clinic, though Amy liked having him around the ranch. Amy devises a way to get Spartan into the yard.
101	16	"Born to Buck"	Stephen Reynolds	Ken Craw	March 24, 2013	228108-16
Shane runs away to Heartland to inform Tim that Miranda has a boyfriend. Tim takes the visit's opportunity to avoid working. Jack is a little grumpy about Georgie not writing him. Jack is offered a job running bronco-riding competitions, reminisces about how the work lifts his mood, and Ty tries to convince him to take the job. Lou learns that Miranda's "new boyfriend" is actually Tim and tells Amy, but everyone keeps it a secret from Shane. Caleb returns, feeling it's time he retired from the rodeo and got a real job. He helps Amy work with a problem horse, which Tim tells her to sell. Caleb and Lou work through their issues and get back to normal. Caleb gets Amy to let him turn the horse into a bronco for the rodeo and has the owner sell it to him. Miranda decides to break up with Tim because the relationship may not work, which would affect Shane.
102	17	"Breaking Point"	Dean Bennett	Mark Haroun	March 31, 2013	228108-17
Tim is offered a great deal on feed, but Jack doesn't want to take the chance. Olivia bullies Georgie as a show-jumping rival. When Georgie overhears Lou and Peter argue on the phone and thinks she is unwanted, insecurities lead her to misbehave. Eric, the new owner of Kendra's farm, searches for a missing horse, Phoenix; Ty tells Amy. Amy is worried because she can't prove ownership of Phoenix and is unable to contact Kendra. Lou thinks Ty and Amy are up to something and confronts them about eloping to Las Vegas, but later learns they are going there for a horse clinic. Amy meets Eric, who seems happy Phoenix has a good home; she invites Eric to watch them jump. Jack and Tim fight over their business partnership since Tim bought the feed and may have exposed their cattle to bovine spongiform encephalopathy (a.k.a. mad cow disease), but they turn out to be healthy. Mallory helps Georgie with advice and a gift. Lou tells Georgie the family is behind her and the adoption. Jack wants to buy out Tim. Eric decides he can't give Phoenix away. Jack adjusts to his new job.
103	18	"Under Pressure"	Dean Bennett	Heather Conkie	April 7, 2013	228108-18
Eric is asking $40,000 for Phoenix. Georgie's older brother Jeff makes a surprise visit and tells the family he wants to take Georgie home. Jeff uses the loss of Phoenix to encourage Georgie to come with him. Amy talks with Jeff about how he wants to be Georgie's hero and how to accomplish that. Jeff gives Phoenix to Georgie for her birthday and tells her Heartland is the right place for her. Jack is under a lot of stress with his job and Tim. Peter and Lou argue about moving to Vancouver. Tim tells Jack he's moving to Moose Jaw. Lou makes herself the victim of everything and blames Jack. Amy has second thoughts about the Vegas trip and says something that upsets Ty. While Ty and Amy get ready for their trip, the family launches fireworks to celebrate Georgie's birthday - but Jack is absent. Tim finds Jack unconscious in a field and calls for an ambulance.

=== Season 7 (2013–14) ===
No. overall	No. in season	Title	Directed by	Written by	Original release date	Prod. code
104	1	"Picking Up the Pieces"	David Frazee	Heather Conkie	October 6, 2013	245278-1
Tim tries to replace Jack as the family patriarch but he only bullies the women at the ranch and oversteps his place after he was told to let them run the ranch. Ty and Amy are called to the airport to help a frightened horse, Emir, but owner Prince Ahmed rudely dismisses them. Jack returns to take back over the ranch, though Lou overreacts to Jack's heart attack. Tim brings sheep onto the ranch and hauls Jack's trucks away without asking. Tim pushes Amy to work with Ahmed for the money. Ty defends Amy to Ahmed about working with his horse. Ahmed’s employee Adrian secretly sends Emir to Heartland so Amy can work with the horse. Amy learns of Emir and Ahmed's past and tells Ahmed that he is the problem and can fix their bond. Georgie has difficulty asking Peter to the Daddy–Daughter Dance due to Olivia's teasing. Georgie reveals to Jack that everyone is lying to him about what's happening at the ranch. Georgie attends the dance with Peter. Amy and Ahmed become friends and he gives Amy an expensive saddle marked with her media name "Miracle Girl".
105	2	"Living in the Moment"	David Frazee	Heather Conkie	October 13, 2013	245278-2
Georgie gets ready for the Spring Classic. Olivia discourages her with lies, provoking Georgie to hit her. Jack and Ty look for the trucks that Tim had towed away and find a ranch for sale but Jack says it is out of Ty's reach. Peter and Lou ground Georgie though Lou later has second thoughts. Jack skips his doctor's appointment and Lou becomes involved, making his heart attack about her and what she needs. Amy asks Tim to help teach Dr. Tricia Virani to ride the horse Amy sold her; Tim refuses - until he sees Tricia. Peter tries to get Georgie and Olivia to make peace. Jack and Tim talk about the trucks and Tim gives Jack some advice about moving on. Ty shows Amy the ranch and they get excited about it. Jack tells Ty that he should set goals and dream about his future. Georgie wins the Spring Classic with Amy's advice. Peter and Lou let Georgie know she has been officially adopted; they hold her naming ceremony. Ty and Amy return to the ranch, which has sold, and find Jack's gold truck which they bring home.
106	3	"Wrecking Ball"	Stefan Scaini	Leila Basen	October 20, 2013	245278-3
Maggie's is for sale and Mallory is upset at losing her job. Lou, Amy and Mallory hope the diner sale won't change under new ownership; Tim wants to turn it into a fast food franchise. When a dead horse is found in a field, Scott and Ty look into the camp the horse came from. Ty notices the horses might be eating chicken feed and is asked to leave. Mallory encourages Lou to buy Maggie's even though it will hurt her marriage. Lou declares war on Tim's attempt to buy the diner. Mallory makes a deal with Tim. Peter pushes to buy a house while Lou wants to invest in Maggie's. Tim tries to make peace with a pony for Katie. When Tim's zoning application doesn't go through, he tries to guilt Peter into buying the diner. Ty asks Amy and Georgie to help him get a poison sample; the owners confront Ty and they realize he wants to help. Tim's constant insulting of Peter causes issues with Lou. Ty wonders if Amy really wants to wear her engagement ring when she keeps losing it. Katie finds the ring after it gets into the laundry.
107	4	"The Penny Drops"	Stefan Scaini	David Preston	October 27, 2013	245278-4
Lou's friend Nicole visits the Dude Ranch. Nicole tells Lou she is being investigated at work, might lose her job, and that she would be interested in running Maggie's and the Dude Ranch. Lou gives the manager job at Maggie's to Mallory. Jake asks Mallory to travel with him but she pushes him away; Mallory struggles and blames Jake for her failures. Lou fires Mallory, which sets her free to follow Jake to Paris. Amy weans a colt. The sheep cause problems with Amy's business and need to be moved but Tim won't help. Amy moves the sheep with Georgie, Lou, and Nicole's help. Tim and Jack come to help, make things worse, and cause Nicole to fall. The women then leave Tim and Jack to clean up their mess. Jack declares the sheep are his because of the money he has invested in their upkeep.
108	5	"Thread the Needle"	Jim Donovan	Ken Craw	November 3, 2013	245278-5
Lou hires Cassandra to help at the Dude Ranch since Mallory has left and Nicole is in the process of moving. Amy and Ty are unhappy Cass was hired after the whole Buckingham incident. Jeff visits and tries to impress Cassandra, not realizing her lack of interest. Georgie is jealous of the time Jeff is spending with Cassandra, and Ty has Jeff help Georgie bring in the hay. Scott is offered a veterinary position with the Royal Canadian Mounted Police (RCMP). He recommends Amy to help one of the Mounties with a riding problem. Amy has difficulty figuring it out but Dr. Virani helps her understand. The Mountie admits to having multiple sclerosis and Amy and Virani give him the help he needs to complete his ride. Scott rehires Cassandra, which causes some tension with Ty over what happened to him after Cass lied about Jeremy's involvement in killing Buckingham. Tim leaves when the hay needs to be brought in. Dr. Virani tells Lou that Jack's health is fine and to leave him alone about it.
109	6	"Now or Never"	Jim Donovan	Mark Haroun	November 10, 2013	245278-6
Georgie isn't happy about being put in ballet class. When she sees her ballet teacher Sandra trick riding with Chaplin, Georgie decides that she'd rather try that. Lou forbids it but Amy has Sandra show Lou that trick riding can be fun and safe. Georgie and Jeff try to get along but he doesn't keep an appointment for miniature golf. Jeff tries to impress Ty by buying his own motorcycle. Ty takes Jeff for a ride to teach him but Jeff only wants to race and wrecks his motorcycle. Ty teaches Jeff how to fix his motorcycle, while Amy talks with Georgie about spending time with Jeff. Jack and Tim clean the attic and find an unfinished dollhouse. Jack finishes building the dollhouse with Tim butting in, and they give it to Katie. Tim tells Jack about the money he put in for Maggie's. Tim tells Lou he is her silent partner in Maggie's and she is happy he believed in her.
110	7	"Best Man"	Chris Potter	Mark Haroun	November 17, 2013	245278-7
Ty's old friend Joe unexpectedly visits. Amy thinks he's suspicious but Ty defends him. Ty and Joe go out drinking with Caleb; Caleb sees Joe steal money off a table, causing an argument with Ty. When Ty tries to talk about this the next morning, Joe asks to borrow $5000. After getting advice from Caleb and Jack, Amy talks to Ty about Joe and their disagreement turns into an argument. When Ty tells Joe that he can't get the money, Joe mentions Ty's past and tries to make him feel guilty and Ty stands up to him. Nicole returns to start running the Dude Ranch and Maggie's, which already have problems with a horse and generator. Nicole tells Caleb that he will have to provide a new horse if his can't be fixed. Caleb offers Nicole a generator to smooth things over. Amy determines what is wrong with the horse after Caleb tells her where the horse came from. Georgie has to do a science project but Lou and Peter take over the project. Georgie later has an idea for her project.
111	8	"Hotshot"	Chris Potter	David Preston	December 1, 2013	245278-8
Lou plans a family vacation in Banff, but cancels it so she and Peter can attend a work conference. Lou addresses the "oil wives," but Peter is upset when he overhears Lou's speech, leading to an argument. They make peace while stuck in an elevator. Tim takes Dr. Virani to Jack's fishing cabin without permission, bringing her daughter Jade along. With the vacation cancelled, Georgie asks Jack to take her to the cabin, and they are upset to find it already occupied. Jade steals Jack's truck with Georgie, crashing it. Jack and Georgie spend the night at the cabin and fish the next day while Jack remembers his time there with Lisa. Amy and Ty work on Caleb's horse. Lou makes Amy babysit Katie even though she is busy. Amy pushes the duty onto Ty who is trying to study; Ty turns the tables on Amy, making her babysit. Amy figures out what Caleb's horse needs. Caleb has become smitten with Nicole.
112	9	"There but for Fortune"	Dean Bennett	Heather Conkie	December 8, 2013	245278-9
Ty discovers his and Amy's dream ranch is for sale. Ahmed offers Amy a high-paying job to work with Zeus, which Adrian does not appreciate. Phoenix is hurt but Amy is too busy to help the horses at Heartland, and Ty notices her priorities shift. Amy uses liberty training to get results. Tim causes issues when he belittles Ty about what he can afford. Ty tries to talk to Amy about providing his part of the finances for houses, but she gets mad. A publisher wants to adapt Lou's family life blog into a book. Lou embellishes her story to be more exciting, but neither her family nor the editor want that. Caleb and Nicole grow closer but Ashley returns to try reconnecting with Caleb. Ahmed fires Adrian for drinking on the job. Amy helps make a poultice for Phoenix when Adrian texts her to help Emir, Ty asks her to leave it to the stable hands but Amy goes and Ty has to set aside his studies to help Phoenix. When Amy arrives at the stables, she finds all the horses out. Emir and Zeus fight and Amy is kicked when she tries to stop them.
113	10	"Darkness and Light"	Dean Bennett	Heather Conkie	January 12, 2014	245278-10
The family rushes to the hospital. Ahmed tells Ty that he didn't text Amy and found her collapsed in the barn. The family argues about what happened and Tim blames Ty. Amy awakens with blindness and no memory of the incident. Her doctor says that this is normal and that she's physically okay. Caleb tells Ty that he had seen the same thing happen on the rodeo and not to worry. Amy is moved to a private room provided by Ahmed and Ty tries helping Amy remember what happened. Ty fights to bring Amy home, according to her wishes. Ty stands up to Tim's bullying about what's best for Amy. Amy starts to recall what happened to her in her dreams after she comes home, and has a vision that it was Adrian that called her to the stables that night. Ahmed has Adrian arrested and charged. Amy tells Ty to leave her if she doesn't regain her sight to which Ty tells her that he will never leave her under any circumstances, and the next day Amy regains her vision. Tim gives a cowardly apology for how he acted towards Ty. Ty takes Amy to see their dream ranch. Ashley tells Caleb that she came home for him and not to check her mother's house. Caleb confronts Ashley over a text message. She says that she's still in love with Caleb and will breakup with her boyfriend, but he sends her back to Vancouver.
114	11	"Better Days"	Stephen Reynolds	Leila Basen	January 19, 2014	245278-11
Amy returns to work despite nightmares about horses. Ahmed lets her know that he is going to euthanize Zeus; Ty is surprised when Amy doesn't care. Ty talks to Jack about Amy still having problems and Jack reminds him of the difficulty Ty had riding after his motorcycle wreck. Ty arranges for Amy to work with Zeus to save the animal and help her overcome her fears. Ahmed overly concerned for Amy only gives him a week before Zeus will be put down. Caleb talks to Amy about how he recovered from his accident on Tim's advice. After dreaming about working with Zeus, Amy feels ready and is able to help the horse, which is returned to a grateful Ahmed. Amy thanks Ty for supporting her, but still not telling him she is afraid to ride. Amy encourages Lou to begin her book tour, leaving Peter in charge. Peter and Georgie learn that wild boars are causing damage around the Dude Ranch. They set traps but are trapped in a bunkhouse by the boars when they don't get the trip wires set on the traps, Jack comes to save them. Caleb performs more chores so that Ty can help Amy and get back into school. With Ashley gone, Nicole resumes flirting with Caleb.
115	12	"Walking Tall"	Stephen Reynolds	Katherine Schlemmer	January 26, 2014	245278-12
While struggling with her injuries, Amy tells Ty that she's all right, but he realizes she is not completely ready to get back to work. Scott examines a neglected and abandoned Tennessee Walking Horse that had its microchip implant removed to conceal its identity and ownership. Ty brings the horse to Heartland to recover, and Amy recognizes evidence of soring (an illegal technique to create high-stepping action in the breed). Scott and Ty encounter another Tennessee Walker and learn that its owner is under investigation by authorities. Amy infiltrates his ranch and sneaks into his barn to gather evidence. When they return, Amy frees the horse in the barn and has to ride a horse to escape. Scott and Ty arrive to help her. Ty tells Amy not to be afraid to tell him the truth. With Ty moving back to the trailer, Georgie wants to move into the attic loft while Peter wants to turn it into an office. Peter concedes to Georgie. Georgie also has to work with Olivia on a 4-H project, taking care of a baby lamb. Olivia continues to insult Georgie for being adopted. Peter offers some advice, and Georgie and Olivia reach an agreement on how to work together.
116	13	"Lost Highway"	Eleanore Lindo	David Preston	March 9, 2014	245278-13
Ty brings Cinders a horse which was shocked by an electric fence near a pond to Heartland for Amy to work with only to find out that it is Lisa's horse. Amy helps Cinders overcome his fear of water until Georgie makes a mistake and causes him to be even worse off than before, upsetting Amy. When Jack and Lisa meet, she explains that she is selling Fairfield Stables. Tim tries to help get Jack and Lisa back together by lying to Jack to make them see each other which causes more problems. Amy encourages Jack to try again with Lisa and to not let Tim ruin it. Jack invites Lisa to talk about their relationship, and they drive together to deliver Cinders to his buyer. Lisa gets an offer for Fairfield but loses cellular phone reception before she can reply. Fairfield truck's navigation system causes Lisa and Jack to get lost. Katie is unhappy in Lou's absence and Peter struggles to take care of her. Georgie is upset when Peter decides to join Lou on the book tour with Katie and without her, but changes her mind.
117	14	"Things We Lost"	Eleanore Lindo	Mark Haroun	March 16, 2014	245278-14
Jack and Lisa are lost and stranded, out of gasoline with no cellphone reception. They unload Cinders from the trailer and proceed on foot but become lost in the woods. They think about their relationship. Cinders is panicked by a thunderstorm and runs off while Jack and Lisa are sleeping; they find him in a gully and can't get him out. Jack sets out alone until he can call Amy, who arrives with Ty to rescue them. Jack and Lisa drive back and Lisa prepares to accept the purchase offer for Fairfield. Jack tells her that he loves her, asking her to stay and be with him. Tim brings Jade to Heartland while Dr. Virani is away and pushes responsibility for her onto Amy. Jade and Georgie trade accusations and pull tricks on each other involving Georgie's 4-H lamb, Clover. They discover common ground and the beginning of a friendship. Amy attempts to make Ty a birthday cake, which they try to eat in the loft.
118	15	"Smoke 'n' Mirrors"	Grant Harvey	Leila Basen	March 23, 2014	245278-15
Tim returns from Moose Jaw early after an argument with Miranda and acts poorly to everyone. He buys an expensive new horse after Dan Hartfield makes fun of him and his horse. Amy tries to tell him that he is wasting his money and offers to help with the horse but Tim won't listen. She eventually gets him to admit what's happening and he sells the horse to Dan. Tim tries to apologize to Ty for how he acts. Georgie wants to try out for the Extreme Team of female trick riders but hasn't been following Sandra's instructions. Sandra talks with Georgie and agrees to teach her a trick for her audition. Georgie doesn't make the team and feels sorry for herself until Sandra says that the team was impressed by her tryout. Ty and Cassandra talk about the Jeremy incident and work things out.
119	16	"The Comeback Kid"	Grant Harvey	Pamela Pinch	March 30, 2014	245278-16
Ty takes extra shifts at the clinic, trying to raise a down payment for the ranch. Tim pushes Amy to call Ahmed for work since she doesn't have much. Scott and Ty examine a futurity horse that has problems. Ty talks to Caleb about his money problems. Caleb thinks they could make some money from the futurity horse, and Ty invests his savings without talking to Amy. Lou returns from her book tour which failed and immediately gets involved in everything. Tim starts an issue insulting Ty and Amy about their money situation, and Lou offers to run a comeback clinic. However, Lou runs it how she wants not listening to Amy's input and the clinic only draws a few people. Lou overhears Amy counselling one of them about what happened to her and Lou's blog post about it goes viral. Amy is suddenly inundated with customers and also gets a call from Ahmed. Georgie gets in trouble for not keeping a promise. When Ty is too busy to repair Tim's truck, Tim looks for someone else to fix it. His buddy can't get parts, so Tim brings it back to Ty.
120	17	"On the Line"	Dean Bennett	Mark Haroun	April 6, 2014	245278-17
Ahmed asks Amy to be his head trainer, calling her his good luck charm. Amy talks about this with Ty and leaves him thinking she won't take it. Caleb wants Amy's help with the futurity horse and says Ty made a mistake not telling Amy about his investment. Lou tells Amy her suspicions that Ahmed has feelings for Amy, and Caleb warns Ty about Ahmed's expensive gifts and job offer. Ty goes to talk to Amy but finds her with Ahmed at Heartland. Caleb reveals Ty's investment to Amy by accident while seeking her help. Amy feels betrayed by Ty and takes the job with Ahmed, saying Ty left her no choice and turning her back on working at Heartland. Amy agrees to help with the futurity horse but won't talk to Ty. Tim makes changes at Maggie's upsetting Lou because he didn't talk to her. She puts up a comment box and it confirms that customers prefer Tim's changes but she reverses them regardless. Later, when she discovers sales have improved, Lou tells Tim she'll start taking his suggestions seriously. Georgie starts a friendship with her classmate Stephen after talking to him on the school bus.
121	18	"Be Careful What You Wish For"	Dean Bennett	Heather Conkie	April 13, 2014	245278-18
Ty continues to try and talk to Amy but she tells him she is afraid he will make decisions like this in the future. Amy tells Ahmed that she wants her future to be with him as he asks for a commitment, while looking at her as more than an employee. Ty tells Amy that it is important for him to be an equal partner financially in their relationship. Amy tells Ty that she doesn't know what she wants for the future, making Ty worried. Amy sees what is wrong with Charger; Caleb uses another rider to make her jealous and Amy rides away with the win. Ahmed follows Amy and offers her a job with him in Europe for four months. Caleb and Ty then win the jackpot. Ty waits for Amy to put a down payment on the ranch, but holds off after she tells him about Ahmed's offer. As she leaves, Lou warns Amy to be careful of Ahmed. Ty is left uncertain of where he stands with Amy and what she wants. Lisa returns from France and spends time with Jack, who proposes marriage. They decide to elope at the Dude Ranch and Tim invites himself to the wedding. Georgie wants a trick saddle and her friendship with Stephen grows.

=== Season 8 (2014–15) ===
No. overall	No. in season	Title	Directed by	Written by	Original release date	Prod. code
122	1	"There and Back Again"	Stefan Scaini	Heather Conkie	September 28, 2014	255168-1
Amy and Ahmed kiss after he gives her a necklace on her last night in Europe, but she doesn't tell Ty about it. Ty and Caleb work to keep their Livestock business going while Tim competes against them and undercuts them on sales. Amy talks about all her adventures and shows the gifts she received, including a necklace from Ahmed which she claims was from the team. Amy hadn't kept in touch with Ty as she promised and avoids Ty's attempts to kiss her. Their lack of communication causes them to miss their chance to buy their dream ranch, which Amy blames on Ty though she wouldn't answer him. Ty asks Amy if he can use some of the ranch money to buy a new truck which upsets her. Amy acts horribly to everyone and prefers working with high-end horses now. Ahmed sends a new horse for Amy to work with then gives it to her as a gift, which Ty finds odd. Georgie supports Amy until she finds a blog that shows Amy and Ahmed kissing. Lisa and Jack have kept their marriage secret. Tim reveals it and Lou becomes upset that she wasn't included.
123	2	"The Big Red Wall"	Stefan Scaini	David Preston	October 5, 2014	255168-2
Tim continues trying to undermine Caleb and Ty's competing business. Amy offers to help train Ty and Caleb's horses but quits after she and Caleb argue; Ty talks her into coming back. Tim treats Amy poorly for helping Ty and Caleb. Amy gets Ty to talk to Tim after he is rude to her for training his horses. Lou tries to make Jack feel guilty about concealing his marriage, claiming that it has affected Georgie. Lou hosts a wedding reception for Jack and Lisa, and everyone has a great time at the party, including Georgie who dances with her friend Stephen. Georgie stops helping Amy and avoids her. Georgie shows the blog to Lou, who confronts Amy over it. Amy dismisses it, saying that she pushed Ahmed away after he kissed her and that it is just bad luck that it was filmed. Ty encourages Amy's work with Ahmed's horses, while she acts coldly towards him. Georgie throws away the press clippings she had collected about Amy, no longer idolizing her. Val returns to Hudson to transition Briar Ridge to her son Jesse, who offers Amy a job. Val lets Jack know that her cancer has returned.
124	3	"Severed Ties"	Bruce McDonald	Ken Craw	October 12, 2014	255168-3
With Amy's help, Ty and Caleb's horses are almost ready for sale. Ahmed gives Amy a new truck and asks his “good luck charm” to return to the tour. Lou confronts Amy about what's going on with Ahmed. Amy accuses Ty of wanting her to quit; he tells her that she needs to figure out what she wants to do. Scott tries to merge his clinic with another and warns that Ty might lose his job. When Scott can't give him a commitment, Ty quits and takes a job at the animal reserve he took Georgie to make a donation. Amy learns why Georgie has been avoiding her and tries to explain the kiss but Georgie makes her realize how badly she betrayed Ty. Amy quits Ahmed's tour and tells Ty but not about what happened between them. Ty says that he quit because he lost trust in Scott for lying to him. Tim runs into old friend Casey McMurtry, who invites him to be in a roping jackpot. Lou and Peter disagree about potential pre-schools and Lou takes Katie for an assessment.
125	4	"Secrets and Lies"	David Preston	Heather Conkie	October 19, 2014	255168-4
Ty has a hectic first day at the Bob Granger reserve with a pregnant wolf. Ahmed unexpectedly arrives, refusing Amy's resignation. Ahmed wants to buy Amy a house and professes his love for her, claiming to know her feelings because she is wearing his necklace and accepted all his gifts and attention. Amy tells him that she loves Ty but still doesn't take any blame. Unaware of this, Tim brings Ahmed to a family dinner. It comes out at dinner that Amy and Ahmed kissed and that Ahmed told Amy he loves her. Ahmed implores Amy to tell her family about them and she says they ended their relationship. Ty and Ahmed fight and Ahmed accuses Ty of holding her back. Ty leaves for the reserve where he is only able to save one wolf cub. Amy shows Ty the video but still denies she did anything. Ty tells her she has changed and isn't the same person and that they need to take a break. Tim leaves town with Casey, feeling at fault. Lou and Peter take Katie to a specialist who finds nothing wrong. Georgie asks for a trick riding horse to compete with Olivia; Ty and Caleb find one.
126	5	"Endings and Beginnings"	Anne Wheeler	Leila Basen	October 26, 2014	255168-5
Ty brings Georgie the wolf cub to care for. Lou hires Jade to work at the Dude Ranch. Ty tells Jack that he still loves Amy, but Ahmed is right; he does not want to hold her back in what she can achieve and it is up to her to decide what she wants. Amy struggles to get two horses to work together, having issues with Ty and denying any wrongdoing. Thinking she can't help the horses, Amy sends them to Jesse. Sandra asks Amy to work with the horses again and Jesse has her come to his stables. With Sandra's encouragement, Amy gets the horses working together and tells Jesse that she doesn't want to work for him. Georgie tries to use the cub to get Amy and Ty back together. Georgie blames herself for their breakup and Amy tells her it was her fault. Jade takes advantage of her new work situation, throwing a party with her friends. Lou has Jade clean up and fires her. Ty discovers a poached bear with its gallbladder missing but animal reserve owner Bob tells him not to get involved. Ty tears down a trail camera that the poachers were using. The poachers find and beat Ty, threatening to kill him if he interferes again.
127	6	"Steal Away"	Anne Wheeler	Pamela Pinch	November 2, 2014	255168-6
Jack agrees to watch Jade while her mother is out of town and Lou warns him about her work attitude. Jack enlists Georgie to instruct Jade at being a ranch hand. Ty finds another poached bear. Bob refuses to help Ty with the poachers, saying that it is too dangerous and to leave it to Fish and Wildlife Services. Jack talks to Amy about Ty, telling her that she has to talk to him no matter how difficult it is. Amy becomes upset with Georgie and Jade when a horse repeatedly gets loose. Scott and Ty catch the poachers and Ty discovers that Bob was involved. Bob explains that it was for the greater good to lose a few bears in order to help many other animals. Georgie and Jade show that the horse learned to let itself out of its stall, and Amy apologizes. Scott hires Ty back. Amy and Ty pass on the road and Ty tries tells her he was rehired by Scott. Amy tells Ty she misses him; Ty tells her to have a good day.
128	7	"Walk a Mile"	Chris Potter	Mark Haroun	November 9, 2014	255168-7
Tim and Casey return. Amy struggles to help a Hutterite family, whose team of Percheron horses ran amok on a hayride. After working with the horses, Amy has Paul drive them and confirms that he is the problem. Georgie bonds with the daughter Hanna. Amy has Lou go to the clinic to pick up meds to avoid talking to Ty. Ty is feeling pressured at the clinic from Scott thinking he is mad at him. Hanna reveals that Paul prefers machines to horses and that she can handle the team herself. With Jack's help, Paul fixes his tractor. Tim undermines his relationship with Casey and she breaks up. Scott says that he knows Ty will become a great veterinarian and he is just pushing him. Tim tells Amy she needs to fight for what she wants. Jack confronts his traditional ideals about marriage with Lisa. Amy goes to Ty's trailer and they talk briefly before Amy rides away crying, seeing that Ty is moving forward.
129	8	"The Family Tree"	Chris Potter	David Preston	November 23, 2014	255168-8
Casey expresses interest in buying one of Ty and Caleb's bulldogging horses but he needs some improvement. Caleb calls Amy to help without letting Ty know, causing more tension between Ty and Amy. Tim begs Casey for a second chance and she agrees, knowing about not wanting to get back into bulldogging. Tim thinks the horse is intended for him. Ty ends their partnership so he can focus on school and a better plan for his future. Ty and Caleb go drinking to celebrate when the last sale to Casey is completed. Caleb is upset and makes a partnership deal with Jesse, though Ty tells him it is a bad idea. Jesse punches Ty and Caleb jumps in, provoking a bar fight. Ty has to call Amy to get them from the drunk tank; Amy tells Ty she hates him and says not to call her again. Tim misses Casey and Amy tells him to fight for her. Lou uses Georgie's school project to help her learn about her family tree. Lou invites Georgie's aunt Crystal without knowing anything about her and regrets it when she arrives. Crystal is told to leave after causing Georgie to get hurt and leaves a questionable letter for the family.
130	9	"The Pike River Cull"	Dean Bennett	Heather Conkie	December 7, 2014	255168-9
Amy considers ending things with Ty because he hasn't thanked her for retrieving him from the drunk tank, and removes her ring. Lou questions Peter when he cancels a flight home. Joanne uses the cull to get Jack to talk to Will about moving with her; Jack takes Amy with him. Tim lies to Ty to get him to come, hoping to reconcile the couple. Amy asks Jack to help keep her and Ty apart. Amy thanks Ty for backing her when she argues against the cull; later they take a trail ride and find a trap set before the cull has been authorized. The cull begins and horses are taken from Will's land to the trap. When Will goes missing, Amy and Ty find him opening the corral to release the wild horses. The herd runs when rancher Matt Pincher fires a warning shot. Amy and Ty kiss as the police arrive. Meanwhile, a Child protection agent arrives at Heartland to investigate a complaint against Lou and Peter. After avoiding a discussion about family commitment, Peter expresses how he feels left out but Lou says he is isolating himself. Peter thinks it isn't working out.
131	10	"The Heart of a River"	Dean Bennett	Heather Conkie	January 11, 2015	255168-10
Facing arrest, Amy and Ty reluctantly return the wild horses to the corral while planning how to fight. Matt Pincher defends the cull to the Pike River community, but his figures are questioned. Ty and Amy are allowed to look after the herd's health; they talk but it doesn't go well, with Amy blaming Ty for avoiding her and saying she missed working together. As Ty, Amy and Tim are looking to rehome the horses, they learn Matt plans to auction the animals. Will appeals to Matt, recounting Matt's father's love of the wild horses. Amy learns that Matt blames the horses for his father's death. Thanks to a scheming Crystal, Lou and Peter face child-endangerment charges but figure out a solution. The child protection agent overhears Crystal try to blackmail Lou and Peter, and the charges are dropped. Amy, Ty and Will are resigned to losing the wild herd when Matt unexpectedly releases them to honor his father. Ty tells Amy she's changed in a great way and he wants a life with her. They tell the family they're getting married.
132	11	"The Silent Partner"	Gail Harvey	David Preston	January 18, 2015	255168-11
Jack returns early from an overnight trip with Lisa. Amy agrees to work with a rich oil man to help Lou, by getting him to offer Peter a job. Caleb buys out Ty from their partnership but Ty worries that Jesse is taking advantage of him. Jack discloses an argument with Lisa about helping with Ty and Amy's wedding plans. Ty burns the partnership buyout check. Georgie struggles to care for two horses. Lou learns Peter has a meeting for a new job. Georgie accepts help from a friend, but yells at him for riding Phoenix. Peter is dismissive about his job meeting. Georgie calls her friend to apologize. Ty grows concerned when he sees Caleb making out with Cassandra (Jesse's girlfriend) and confronts him. Amy learns Peter got a job offer, but Ty advises her to keep quiet in case Peter wants to surprise Lou. Later, Amy tells Lou that Peter turned down the offer, and Lou questions if her marriage will survive. Amy and Ty talk about how secrets and a lack of communication hurt their relationship, and Amy promises there will be no more secrets between them.
133	12	"Broken Heartland"	Gail Harvey	Mark Haroun	February 1, 2015	255168-12
Lou confronts Peter about turning down a job close to home. Peter defensively notes the many decisions Lou made without him in the past. Jade arrives and volunteers at the vet clinic with Georgie. Ty and Amy leave for a horse clinic in Montana, but their truck is stolen when they stop for a trail ride. They recover the truck, which was taken by a young runaway (Steph La Rochelle), and try to help her. Lou and Peter's argument escalates and they wonder what's keeping them together. Jack calls Amy home to help Lou; Amy and Ty take the runaway home to her grateful mother. Peter leaves for the airport; Lou, with Amy's encouragement, heads to the airport to follow Peter to Vancouver.
134	13	"Cowgirls Don't Cry"	Stefan Scaini	Mark Haroun	February 15, 2015	255168-13
Lisa and Lou start planning Amy's wedding, to her reluctance. Georgie finds a dress for her dance but can't attend after contracting chickenpox. Ty leaves to check on Lily when her wedding invitation is returned. Wade says that Lily is in drug rehabilitation clinic and didn't want Ty to know. Ty apologizes to Wade and Ty and Amy give him some money to help with Lily's rehab. Ty is suspicious when Wade is out all night but Amy learns that he is working two jobs for Lily. Casey encourages Tim to start a rodeo school with Jack's support. Jade is in his first bronco-riding class and is upset after being teased by a boy. Tim encourages her to finish the class and show the boys but Jade rides the bronco without permission. Tim is forced to expel Jade, though he tells her that he is proud of how she handled the boys. Amy becomes stressed and Ty tells Lisa that this could be good for her. Amy confides about missing her mother and takes Ty to visit her mother's grave.
135	14	"Riders on the Storm"	Stefan Scaini	Ken Craw	March 1, 2015	255168-14
Ty is uncertain when he gets a call from Wade about visiting Lily. Amy and Ty help Scott's nephew Emmett, who is uncertain about continuing the family tradition of relay horse racing. Emmett confides to Scott that he wants to quit and leave the reservation. Amy talks to Ty about his fears of seeing his mother and Amy wants to support them. Georgie is caught between Jeff and Jade, who are exchanging half-truths and lies in order to impress each other. Jack thinks that her stress is about Lou and Peter's marriage problems. Ty decides to go; but, learns that Lily doesn't want him to visit her in rehabilitation. Scott challenges Emmett to do what he really wants; Emmett decides to stay and race. Tim reluctantly accepts Jack's offer to help with the rodeo school and struggles with news that Miranda is getting married. Ty decides to visit his mom but tells Amy that he needs to go alone.
136	15	"Eclipse of the Heart"	Norma Bailey	Ken Craw	March 8, 2015	255168-15
Lou returns from Vancouver by herself and launches into the wedding plans. Georgie is disappointed that Peter might not return home to watch the lunar eclipse with her. Lou reminiscences about Peter. Tim asks Caleb to find another horse for the school while he leaves town. Amy suggests a good horse for Caleb. Jack goes after Tim, catching him before he can interrupt Miranda's wedding. When Caleb tries to buy the horse as cheaply as possible, Amy realizes that Caleb's partnership with Jesse is struggling. Lou tells Amy that she and Peter are separating. Peter arrives and helps Georgie with the telescope for the eclipse. Lou and Peter agree that their decision is best for them.
137	16	"Faking it"	Norma Bailey	Pamela Pinch	March 15, 2015	255168-16
Lou tells Jack and Tim about her separation. Peter becomes involved in an argument between Olivia and Georgie. Katie, who overheard Lou talking about the divorce, blurts "divorce" at dinner; Georgie gets very upset with her parents. Jack reassures Georgie that she will still have a family. Olivia empathizes with Georgie and explains that her parents are divorced. Amy talks to Georgie about the divorce. Jesse calls in Caleb's loan, which would ruin him. Tim and Casey help at the diner, and he discovers that they have a lot to learn about each other. Lou asks Amy to coach Georgie for the trick-riding competition. Amy offers to teach her a new trick, which Georgie performs and makes the team. Ty tells Amy he might be in trouble after attacking Jesse.
138	17	"All I Need is You"	Dean Bennett	Mark Haroun	March 22, 2015	255168-17
Amy starts working with an abandoned horse to get away from the wedding plans and preparations by Lou and Lisa. Georgie helps Amy with the horse. Ty is arrested for assaulting Jesse and is bailed out by an unhappy Jack. Ty apologizes to Amy and says his future is uncertain. Jack supports Ty and expects he will make the right decisions over the next days. Georgie sees an intimate moment between Peter and Lou. Without telling Ty, Amy offers to work for Jesse if he'll drop the charges but Jesse refuses. Jack asks Val if the matter can be settled. Ty suggests postponing the wedding. Val demands Jesse drop the charges, under threat of being fired from Briar Ridge. Ty and Amy are deciding how to tell the family about postponing the wedding when Ty's lawyer informs him that the charges have been dropped. Not wanting to wait any longer, Amy says they should marry on their own; they go to Pike River and approach a minister to elope. Georgie struggles with the separation and her abandonment issues. Tim tells Casey how he feels about her and obsesses over her response. Jack worries about his horse Paint's lack of energy.
139	18	"Written in Stone"	Dean Bennett	Heather Conkie	March 29, 2015	255168-18
Amy and Ty return to Heartland. Lou is relieved to learn they didn't get married, but her wedding plans all go wrong. Georgie names the new horse Trouble and Amy assures Georgie that the horse can have as many chances as it needs. Georgie changes her mind about being in the wedding party. Tim makes ill-advised comments to Peter, who challenges him on what it means to be a father. Caleb remedies a mix-up with the tuxedoes. The wedding commences at Heartland, with Amy and Jack riding Spartan and Paint from the barn to the house, led by Sugarfoot. It's Paint's last ride before retiring to pasture. Casey tells Tim she loves him and that she didn't hear him say it before. Val gives Caleb money to cover the lien against his property and admits that he made Ashley happy. Georgie asks Jeff if she can live with him, but he tells her it's better for her at Heartland. When Amy and Ty are locked out of the Dude Ranch on their wedding night, they return to the loft where their relationship began. Following in Amy's footsteps with Spartan, Georgie is able to get through to Trouble.

=== Season 9 (2015–16) ===
No. overall	No. in season	Title	Directed by	Written by	Original release date	Prod. code
140	1	"Brave New World"	Bruce McDonald	Heather Conkie	October 4, 2015	272188-1
Amy and Georgie track an injured horse but are turned back by a bear. Tim has been delaying renovations to the loft, upsetting Ty and Amy and bringing a rebuke from Jack, who returns after several months away. Georgie sees the horse again and follows it, despite warnings not to do so. Amy follows her. Lou tells Jack that she was too busy to let him know about Tim’s delayed renovations. Amy and Georgie take the horse to Ty for treatment, naming it Bear. Ty and Amy try to sleep in the loft during a hail storm. Bear becomes anxious in its stall. Ty gets tired of the delays to the loft renovations and Jack takes over. Georgie is learning roman riding on Phoenix and Trouble (standing with a foot on each horse's back). Lou and Peter come into conflict over where the girls will spend their summer. Georgie lets Bear out, and she and Amy follow Bear to another horse at an abandoned farm. They take the horse to Heartland and name it Buddy. Lou won't concede to any of Peter's compromises. Peter asks her to send a separation agreement to his lawyer, but Georgie steals the papers to prevent their being sent.
141	2	"Begin Again"	Bruce McDonald	Mark Haroun	October 11, 2015	272188-2
Georgie and Stephen ride together after school and wager a lunch on who rides better. Ty and Amy talk about why Buddy isn't eating. Jack takes it slow while his knee heals. Georgie learns that Stephen will be away during the summer. Ty puts Buddy on a fluid diet. Peter calls Lou for the missing separation papers. Georgie wrongfully enters the foreclosed farmhouse where they found Buddy to learn about the owner. Scott tells Ty and Cassandra to celebrate before graduation. Lou stops Katie's riding lessons, afraid that they would affect the separation agreement. Ty invites Amy to a party; Georgie talks her into going. Georgie is nonchalant when Stephen says goodbye. Lou changes her mind, allowing Katie's lessons. Tim confronts Jack about not riding and Jack admits that it is because of Paint. Amy learns what happened with Buddy and Bear. Georgie admits that she took the papers and wants to see Peter. Lou promises to handle the separation better. Amy gets Jack to play guitar for Buddy. Georgie gives Stephen a proper goodbye. Amy gives Ty a desk for the office and a sign for their future business.
142	3	"Riding for a Fall"	Dean Bennett	Ken Craw	October 18, 2015	272188-3
Jade wants to bronco ride at the rodeo, though Tim is concerned whether she is ready. Peter returns to spend time with the kids and learns Georgie is failing math. Scott offers Ty a partnership. Tim ridicules the thought of Amy and Ty starting their own business. Georgie asks Peter to tutor her instead of Lou. Georgie devises a new trick to perform. Casey names the cancer-charity rodeo after her deceased husband Hank. Lou learns Georgie lied to Peter to use a calculator, and talks to her about her attitude and lying. Jade gets a bad draw at the rodeo but won't let Tim pull her. Jade gets hurt and Tim discovers she lied about the permission form she gave him. Casey books the Extreme Team for the rodeo. Georgie completes a roman riding jump at the rodeo. Ty tells Scott he's not sure about accepting his offer, because it could affect him and Amy working together. Tim lets Casey know why he doesn't take pain killers. Peter talks to Lou about Georgie not wanting to go to Vancouver and says he will visit every chance he gets.
143	4	"Ties of the Earth"	Dean Bennett	Heather Conkie	October 25, 2015	272188-4
Amy and Ty stop at a yard sale to buy things for their loft and find a picture of Jack when he first got Paint. Jack finds Paint fallen in the field and Ty looks after him while Scott is out of town. Jack prepares himself for the worst as Amy, Georgie and Ty work on Paint. Jack explains why he didn't want to put Paint in the barn, but understands it is best now and stays in the barn with Paint. He becomes more optimistic as Paint moves around better, but Ty is worried that Paint's condition could change rapidly. Georgie's teacher recommends classmate Adam as her math tutor. Georgie does not like him and conspires with Jade to get him fired. Georgie desires to study with Stephen. Paint falls again and cannot get up, and Jack tells Ty that he needs to euthanize Paint for him. Adam apologizes when he learns what happened with Paint and shares a poem that helped him when his dog was euthanized. Jack buries Paint and Amy and Georgie give him gifts to remember Paint.
144	5	"Back in the Saddle"	Chris Potter	Bonnie Fairweather	November 1, 2015	272188-5
Casey's cowboy competition has advanced its schedule and Lisa provides assistance running it. Georgie has little time to train Buddy for the competition and asks Jack to help, and he decides to help with Buddy. Bob is back at the reserve and Ty tells him he doesn't want him coming around the clinic. Jack is dealing with Paint's death and is weary of everyone trying to find him a new horse. Jack becomes upset with Georgie when he realizes she wants them to bond and for not respecting his wishes. Ty has taken an injured coyote to the reserve when he is unable to find anyone else to care for it. Bob tells Ty he went to jail after confessing to involvement in poaching, earning Ty's respect. Amy and Georgie take first and second place at the competition. Casey and Lisa come into conflict over the menu for the event, and Amy advises Casey to make sure Lisa knows what she wants. Tim is working slowly on the loft build with Peter, criticizing Peter and complaining to Jack. Lou tells Tim that he is causing more problems with his attitude.
145	6	"Over and Out"	Chris Potter	Pamela Pinch	November 8, 2015	272188-6
Amy begins training Bear as a roping horse for Tim's school. Bob asks Ty to check on a hurt eagle in a remote location. Amy goes with Ty while working Bear in open country; they find the eagle and Ty decides it should be taken to the clinic. Uncertain if they are lost, Ty approaches a cliff edge to get his bearings and falls over when Harley is startled. Amy and Bear rescue Ty from a ledge and are forced to camp overnight. After the rescue experience, Amy realizes Bear might make a good police horse. Georgie hides her final grades and is unhappy she still has to be tutored, even though she got a B in math. She volunteers at the reserve with Jade and Adam for extra credit. Upset, Georgie unfairly criticizes Adam to Jade - but unknowingly keys her walkie-talkie and Adam overhears everything. Against Adam's advice, Georgie takes Bob's all-terrain vehicle but runs out of gas; the ATV then rolls downhill and crashes. Adam confronts Georgie about her remarks. Bob is mad at Georgie for not listening to him and for taking the ATV. Lou becomes upset with Lisa when she feels Lisa overstepped with Katie; they talk it out and understand each other better.
146	7	"Fearless"	Dawn Wilkinson	Mark Haroun	November 15, 2015	272188-7
Tim is emotional as Katie goes to her first day of kindergarten. Tim volunteers to give Georgie driving lessons since he missed the chance with Lou and Amy. Ty and Amy invite Caleb and Cassandra to a housewarming dinner, during which Caleb and Cassandra argue about various matters. Amy and Caleb help a theatrical jouster who was badly injured to regain his confidence. After a couple driving lessons, Georgie accepts Ty's offer to go for a drive but she struggles on the public road. Katie tells Lou that she married and divorced her kindergarten friend in one day. Georgie tells Lou that she is anxious because of her parents' fatal crash and wants to delay learning to drive. Ty talks to Cassandra, she realizes she wants a committed relationship with Caleb. Georgie decides to face her fears and has Tim teach her again. Lou talks to Katie's friend's mother about the marriage and divorce and realizes that they are both going through a divorce.
147	8	"Reckless Abandon"	Dawn Wilkinson	Ken Craw	November 22, 2015	272188-8
Olivia's horse Budget Buster is brought to Heartland for help. When Olivia argues that Amy can't fix her horse, Georgie rides Buster trying to show Olivia is the problem but the horse is injured. The Calgary Police Service inspect Bear and Amy lets them have him, angering Georgie. She gets angrier when her friend Stephen says he's moving away. Georgie heedlessly blames Amy for the injury and for Stephen's departure. Amy tells Georgie that Olivia's horse has kissing spines and should recover, and Bear will be happy in his new role. Bear and Buddy have a final farewell. Meanwhile, Tim thinks Casey wants them to live together, but Casey gently explains she has bought a house for herself. Tim acts relieved but is disappointed. An insurance inspector examines the Heartland loft; he invites Lou for coffee but she turns him down for an actual date. When the loft fails inspection, Lou thinks it's because of her rejection and makes a scene at Maggie's. However, the inspector had actual concerns with the loft and puts a chagrined Lou in her place. Lou realizes she's not ready to date.
148	9	"A Matter of Trust"	Bruce McDonald	Heather Conkie	December 6, 2015	272188-9
Georgie is invited on an unsupervised trip to Jasper with other Extreme Team girls, but this conflicts with Lou's surprise vacation to the Dominican Republic for her, Georgie and Katie. Georgie lies about the Jasper trip, saying the coaches are going, and plays Peter and Lou. Lou learns the truth from the coach. Ty brings home abandoned possums to look after until Fish and Wildlife can take them, but Georgie accidentally lets the possums out after being told not to open their cage. Ty searches for the possums without any luck. Caleb brings his horse Rusty for Ty and Amy to look at. Ty initially believes Rusty has a poisoning symptom similar to a microbe in possums, but tests show Rusty was poisoned by pesticide dumped in Weber's Creek. Georgie stops doing her chores and taking care of Phoenix, blaming Lou and boycotting the vacation. Jack scolds Georgie for not taking care of Phoenix and rides him to Weber's Creek, unaware that it is poisoned. An upset Georgie runs away.
149	10	"Darkness Before Dawn"	Bruce McDonald	Heather Conkie	January 10, 2016	272188-10
Georgie runs away to Vancouver, but Peter isn't home; she gets the concierge to let her in. Lou and the family search for her. Unable to reach Peter, Georgie phones a frantic Lou who flies to get her; she arrives and comforts Georgie. Unexpectedly, a woman who introduces herself as Sylvia Pratt walks in looking for Peter and has an awkward encounter with Lou and Georgie. Lou realizes Peter has moved on, and leaves her wedding rings at the condo before heading home. Amy and Ty discover Phoenix is poisoned and work to save him. When Georgie returns, Ty tells her Phoenix is in bad shape. Jack, Tim and Caleb find the man who was polluting the creek Phoenix drank from and deal with him strongly before insisting he clean up the mess. Jack talks to an apologetic Georgie, saying she’s part of the family and can’t run from her problems. Lou and Georgie spend the night looking after Phoenix and Georgie asks if she can still go on the vacation. Peter returns home to numerous phone messages; he looks upset when he finds Lou's rings on his counter.
150	11	"Making the Grade"	Gail Harvey	Pamela Pinch	January 17, 2016	272188-11
Ty and Amy's weekend plans are suspended when Tim starts a cattle drive. Ty reluctantly lends a hand, knowing how Tim will treat him. Amy asks Lou to help her with a new chair for Ty. Tim makes Ty do everything, even though Jack tells him it is too much. Lou makes fun of Amy's marriage and Amy counters with Lou's relationship record. Georgie invites Adam to a corn maze, but they get lost in it until Georgie uses popcorn to find a way out. Jack chases after a longhorn, is knocked unconscious, and is sent home from the drive. Ty finds a lame steer with foot rot and treats it, saving the herd from an outbreak. Amy gives Ty his early birthday presents and he tries to tell her about how Tim acted but Tim interrupts, needing help to finish the drive. Tim belittles Ty's work on the drive until Amy points out that Ty saved the herd. Ty finds Jack's hat.
151	12	"The Real Deal"	Gail Harvey	Ken Craw	January 24, 2016	272188-12
Jade has recovered from her bronco riding injury and Tim arranges a meeting with a sponsor; Jade gets the sponsorship but Caleb also tries to get it. Tim realizes the sponsors don't care whether or not Jade can ride. Amy explains to Jade what she went through with sponsors, but Jade thinks everyone is jealous. Jade finally understands what the sponsors want at a photo shoot, where Caleb stands up for her. Jade returns and apologizes. Cassandra agrees to help Trouble who experiences pain while jumping. Lou has a long wish list as she returns to online dating; she finds one guy online but it doesn't work out. Jack has trouble with the new smartphone Lisa got him. Cassandra tells Amy she just wants to be friends. Amy misses Ty who is away at a veterinary conference. She offends Cassandra who asks to hang out together. The women all go for a ride.
152	13	"Risky Business"	Eleanore Lindo	Bonnie Fairweather	February 7, 2016	272188-13
Tim lies to Casey about his past with Janice. Janice brings Amy a racehorse. Cassandra's initial diagnosis is that the horse has Wobbler disease. Janice feels the need to have the horse euthanized due to the expense of surgery. Tim gets Scott to give Janice a good deal. Adam confronts Georgie about his campaign for class president being jeopardized by Georgie's video of him being spit on by a llama. Georgie discovers the video was spread by a friend of Olivia. To help Adam with his campaign, Georgie makes a parody of the first video (with Adam's involvement), and Adam winds up winning the election. Janice advises Georgie about making a comeback. At dinner, both women joke about Tim's inability to run his business without help. Tim rejects an offer to coach a Texas junior-college rodeo team. Casey confronts Tim about not discussing rejecting the coaching offer with her after she learns about it from Janice, and raises other relationship issues. Katie "breaks" Jack's smartphone and hides it under her bed, but Jack eventually finds it. Cassandra privately tells Amy she might be pregnant and takes a test, but Caleb finds the positive pregnancy test and concludes that Amy is pregnant.
153	14	"No Regrets"	Eleanore Lindo	Bonnie Fairweather	February 14, 2016	272188-14
Jack is aided mending a gate by Mitch Cutty, who he invites to have Amy look at his horse Maverick. Jack wants to hire Mitch as a ranch hand but Amy is against it, suspecting that Mitch abandoned Maverick. Mitch declines Jack's offer to instead work the oil fields. Amy tells Mitch he needs to rebuild his relationship with Maverick after a year's absence, but learns Mitch was serving overseas with the military. Mitch decides to stay with Maverick. Caleb surprises Ty by telling him Amy is pregnant. Ty becomes overly concerned about Amy's well-being and panics when Amy is bucked off Maverick. They argue until Amy realizes and explains the misunderstanding. Ty breaks Amy's confidence and tells Caleb that Cassandra is pregnant, but it's a false alarm. Georgie works with Val Stanton on a school project but concludes bigger isn't always better, even in business. Val is upset when Georgie's project depicts Heartland more positively than Briar Ridge. After Adam tries to kiss Georgie, Jack has them study where he can watch them. Amy advises Georgie to not wait and kiss Adam first. Georgie impulsively does so, telling a pleased Adam she doesn't want to have any regrets.
154	15	"Making a Move"	Stefan Scaini	Pamela Pinch	February 21, 2016	272188-15
Olivia joined the Extreme Team. Lou returns from New York and is surprised to be working with Mitch, her former blind date; she tells Mitch to move his trailer off the Dude Ranch. Georgie is angry with Amy giving Olivia lessons, until she learns it is because of injuring her horse in the past. Lou notices a drop in sales at Maggie's and learns that a food truck is operating across the street from the diner. Olivia's attitude is worse than usual because she thinks she didn't deserve to make the team. Georgie is nervous about seeing Adam and fibs, saying their kiss meant nothing. She later sees Adam kissing Olivia at a party and is upset. Olivia says she didn't know Georgie had feelings for Adam, which Georgie refutes but says it doesn't matter. Tim considers taking the job in Texas after breaking up with Casey. He decides to stay after talking about it with Jade. Jade moves into Caleb's old trailer and throws a party but soon moves out again. Mitch moves the trailer and is couch surfing. Lou lets him know about Caleb's vacant trailer. Mitch gets the food truck to leave and Lou seems to see him in a different light.
155	16	"Pandora's Box"	Stefan Scaini	Ken Craw	March 6, 2016	272188-16
Lisa is upset that Jack missed a lawyer's appointment to review her will. Jack realizes Lisa is using the visit as a distraction because she’s nervous about her medical tests. Lou forgets to cancel Georgie's tutoring, and Georgie is stuck working with Adam. Jack sends Adam home after almost catching him and Georgie kissing. Later, Georgie asks Adam to go out with her rather than Olivia and he agrees. Ty and Amy treat a horse who has trouble breathing. Amy sees Ty with a box and thinks it's an anniversary present. Ty says it's actually the contents of his dad's safe deposit box and considers throwing it away, but changes his mind after talking to Amy. After some Dude Ranch guests leave, Mitch finds furniture left on the roof as a prank. Lou is rude as she and Mitch work to get it down. They get stuck without their phones, but spend time talking and learn they have more in common than they thought. Lou and Mitch almost kiss, then agree it was a mistake - but Lou goes back and kisses Mitch anyway.
156	17	"Love is Just a Word"	Dean Bennett	Mark Haroun	March 13, 2016	272188-17
Amy tries to help Cassandra learn to ride her new horse, Spirit. Cassandra tells Amy she's worried her relationship with Caleb won't last if they don't have more in common. Adam, Jade and Georgie groom miniature horses but one horse, Monty, is a problem. Amy helps Monty and forms a bond. Lou and Mitch try to keep their relationship quiet. Tim encourages everyone to attend the Hudson Heritage Foundation party; he tells Jack that Lou will receive an award. Mitch and Lou attend the party together, but Peter arrives on Tim's invitation. With Tim's encouragement, Peter tells Lou he wants to fix their marriage. Lou leaves the party. Jack talks Lou into returning; she receives her award, thanking her family. Lou breaks up with Mitch. During the party, the teenagers go to the reserve to find the building on fire and rush to save the horses. Georgie is overcome by smoke, but Adam rescues her and Monty. Bob tells Ty the poachers threatened him and asks Ty not to involve the police.
157	18	"Resolutions"	Dean Bennett	Heather Conkie	March 20, 2016	272188-18
Tim tries to reconcile Lou and Peter. Peter wants to buy a house nearby, but Lou doesn't want to see the house or him. Georgie overhears and gets upset, but later tells Lou they will be fine with whatever she chooses. Mitch wishes Lou luck with her future. Lou tells Peter they’re not getting back together and confronts Tim, saying he only meddled over guilt of how he ended things with Casey. Adam tells Georgie his father forbade their friendship, and Georgie calls him gutless and rides away. Adam follows on Spirit, but is thrown. When Georgie goes to help, Adam says he needs his diabetes kit which is on Spirit. She finds it, saving his life. Adam tells his father he wants to spend time with Georgie. When Ty learns Bob wants to shut down the reserve, he offers to help and fight the poachers. Amy tells Ty they need to get away and celebrate their anniversary. Ty gives Amy her anniversary present: Monty. Amy has her own gift for Ty; as they look up in wonder at the Northern Lights, Amy tells Ty she is pregnant and he is elated.

=== Season 10 (2016–17) ===
No. overall	No. in season	Title	Directed by	Written by	Original release date	Prod. code
158	1	"There Will Be Changes"	Bruce McDonald	Heather Conkie	October 2, 2016	294709-1
Jack searches for something Tim tossed out when the loft was fixed. Georgie and Adam are having an anniversary. Mitch and Georgie buy a trail horse, Minnie, for the Dude Ranch and it turns out Minnie is pregnant with twins. Tim gripes about Minnie being out of shape and accuses Mitch of trying to worm his way into the family. Ty is concerned Minnie may lose both foals, but he, Amy and Jack help with a successful delivery. Lou and Tim criticize Amy and Ty for not preparing for their child. Lou tells the family about a business venture, a New York franchise of Maggie's. Georgie's Extreme Team coach is injured; the new coach, Natalie, is overly strict. Natalie seems to have made Olivia her favorite and gives Georgie extra practice. Georgie wants to quit, but decides to stick with the team. Amy worries that she can't ride while pregnant. Jack presents Ty and Amy with the item from the loft, a family heirloom cradle. Amy and Ty look at her 12-week ultrasound.
159	2	"You Just Know"	Bruce McDonald	Mark Haroun	October 9, 2016	294709-2
Minnie has colic and needs surgery. Everyone helps bottle feed the foals, but Amy pushes Ty to bring Minnie back because one of the foals won't take the bottle. Georgie and her teammate Sam bond over dislike of Natalie. Georgie sees Sam secretly loosen Olivia's cinch, causing her to fall. Georgie confronts Sam, who says there was no harm aside from lowering Olivia's favor with Natalie. However, Natalie overhears and suspends Sam from the team. Lou gets upset when she learns Tim bought Katie a goldfish and it died, telling Tim he needs to explain it to her. Tim and Jack have some awkward moments trying to broach the subject. Lou has to deal with her feelings for Mitch. Tim is still trying to manipulate Lou's love life and work life. Mitch gives Lou good advice about her job. Lou tells Mitch she's going to New York and to not wait for her; Mitch wishes her well. Georgie struggles with a school assignment about her biggest life moment, ultimately deciding it was when she got her family.
160	3	"New Kid in Town"	Eleanore Lindo	Ken Craw	October 16, 2016	294709-3
Ty and Georgie take an interest in the plight of critically endangered Gobi bears in Mongolia. Bob finds that he and Ty could go with Veterinarians Without Borders to help the bears. Ty feels that he needs more information before telling Amy about helping the bears. Bob says Ty will have to decide about helping the bears, as they should be back before Amy delivers. Without talking to Amy, Ty decides not to go to Mongolia because he wants to be there for his family. Adam is stressed about a math test and feels bleak when Georgie receives a better grade than he does. Casey tells Tim she is tired of him acting like a child; she asks Tim to help coach her nephew Clay McMurtry, who makes a bad first impression at the rodeo school and forms a rivalry with Jade. Amy works with a bronco named Hellion with Jack's help. To teach Jade and Clay a lesson, Tim asks them if they can ride Hellion. Casey is upset about the planned bronco ride. Hellion's owner watches and is unimpressed with Clay's ride, but decides to keep the horse after it throws Jade. Casey lets Tim know she cares for him and wants to date him.
161	4	"New Horizons"	Eleanore Lindo	Heather Conkie	October 23, 2016	294709-4
Georgie and Jade convince Tim to let them work at Maggie's. Jade pushes for changes at the diner, but Tim is upset by the cost. Jade and Georgie host a successful open mic night; Amy and Jack perform a song that Lyndy recorded. Tim gets Amy and Ty to look at Casey's horse Cody, which has trouble eating. Ty realizes Cody's problem is due to a bad tooth. Bob tries to change Ty's mind about the Mongolia trip; Georgie tells Amy about Ty's opportunity. Ty still doesn't want to miss her pregnancy. Amy encourages Ty to go, because he always supported her dreams. Ty and Amy mention the decision to the family. Tim is against it and Jack tells Ty that he'll have regrets either way, but is troubled that Ty might not make it back. Ty and Amy are reassured after talking to the person running the program. Ty and Amy discuss their decision with Scott and talk to Jack again. Ty departs for Mongolia.
162	5	"Something to Prove"	Ken Filewych	Mark Haroun	October 30, 2016	294709-5
Ty is traveling to Mongolia. Cassandra is upset at her additional workload and Scott says they can hire a new assistant. Ty tells Amy that Cassandra is trying to get him fired. Amy confronts Cassandra, who feels she deserves more but Amy thinks it's personal. Amy is pulled to the ground by a spooked horse and tells Cassandra about it; Cass helps her out. Later, Cassandra takes Amy to the hospital with Braxton Hicks contractions. Jade and Clay's rivalry becomes increasingly childish. Tim organizes a mounted orienteering challenge at the rodeo school to teach teamwork; Adam and Georgie join the challenge. On the course, Jade (partnered with Clay) lies to get Georgie to change partners, hoping she can use Adam to win. Lisa's Aunt Evelyn visits and is consistently critical. During the orienteering ride, Jack says he wants to stay — to escape Evelyn's criticisms. Lisa tells Evelyn she's happy with her life and Evelyn apologizes to Lisa and Jack.
163	6	"The Green-Eyed Monster"	Pierre Tremblay	Bonnie Fairweather	November 6, 2016	294709-6
Lou returns from New York to find the girls busy. Jade criticizes Georgie and Adam's relationship, convincing Georgie she needs more space. Amy loses a potential client because of her pregnancy. Lisa brings a new client, Nora, a mounted archer who is returning from a pregnancy. Georgie cancels her dates with Adam to try archery and hang out with Clay. Lisa mistakenly throws away Jack's stew-measuring jar and later buys him a recipe book. Jack is unhappy with his new stew and takes it away from the dinner table. Lisa discovers Katie had the jar and returns it to Jack. Amy has trouble with Nora's horse, Doc. Ty and Amy talk by video call. Amy has an appointment to learn the sex of their baby without Ty. Amy realizes Doc is insecure about Nora's new baby and that Spartan is also uneasy – because Amy hasn't been giving him any attention. Adam becomes upset and Georgie tries to repair their relationship. Lou interrupts Mitch's solo fishing trip and is surprised by his reaction. When he returns, Mitch apologizes to Lou for his attitude; Lou says she is the person that can give him alone time.
164	7	"Riding Shotgun"	Chris Potter	Pamela Pinch	November 13, 2016	294709-7
Lou is thrilled when Mitch buys a horse named Venus, thinking it's a romantic gift for her. While working with Venus, Lou and Amy argue about her pregnancy and Lou's decisions with Mitch. Ty and Amy are disappointed that he is missing Amy's prenatal classes; they talk about the ultrasound and agree they will wait to learn the baby's gender. Peter arrives to watch the girls while Lou goes to New York. Peter and Lou argue about her trip since Lou blamed him for the same thing during their marriage, and Peter questions Lou about Mitch. Georgie volunteers at the reserve to spend time with Adam, who accepts Georgie's apology. A potbelly pig at the reserve gets sick and Georgie decides to drive Bob's SUV without a license. Adam's father stops Adam and Georgie, but later takes them to the clinic. Lou and Peter are upset, but Georgie continues to make excuses. Mitch and Jack notice that wolves have taken some calves. Jack sees a wolf, Mitch is unable to shoot it. Mitch tells Jack about what happened to his cousin, Zach when they were deployed. Later, Mitch tells Lou that he bought Venus for the Dude Ranch and apologizes. Lou doesn't tell Mitch how she feels.
165	8	"Here and Now"	Chris Potter	Ken Craw	November 20, 2016	294709-8
Olivia is picked as the Extreme Team's new headliner. Olivia questions Natalie about the "tail drag" she is to perform; Natalie replaces her with Georgie. Georgie asks Amy for help learning the trick but Amy says it's too dangerous for any of the girls. Georgie confronts Natalie about the risk; when Natalie refuses to back down, the entire team walks out. Amy and Tim talk to Natalie but only incur her wrath. Later, Natalie asks if Georgie can bring the team back for one more practice and apologizes. She and the team come to an agreement for how the tail drag will be performed and for their relationship going forward. Jade finds a new sponsor and plans a party at her trailer to celebrate, but it goes overboard and a video of the bash is posted online. As a result, Jade's sponsorship is cancelled. When the sponsor receives good publicity from the video, she reinstates Jade. Will Vernon visits Heartland; Jack is concerned about his friend, but Will is fine - he's there to induct Jack into the Cowboy Hall of Fame. Ty calls to congratulate Jack.
166	9	"A Horse With No Rider"	Dean Bennett	Heather Conkie	December 4, 2016	294709-9
Tim is concerned that Amy is doing clinics and she has second thoughts about pushing Ty to go to Mongolia. In Mongolia, Ty and Bob track an endangered bear that was shot by poachers. Georgie does the horse work for Amy. Karen comes late to a clinic and Amy takes a fall while bringing her horse out of the trailer. The bear has already died but they rush to save its injured cub. Peter talks with Jack about Lou while waiting for her flight to arrive. Peter hears Katie talk about Mitch, and is concerned that Katie has become close with Mitch. Karen suddenly leaves, and Amy, Georgie and Tim leave with her horse. Tim swerves to avoid a boulder on the road; the truck and trailer are wrecked, Karen's horse is trapped in the wrecked trailer. Tim, experiencing trauma symptoms, rides Spartan to get help. Georgie sees Amy in pain; but, Amy says she is OK. Jack and Peter are concerned when they are unable to get in contact with Amy. Lou arrives. Spartan returns to the trailer without a rider.
167	10	"Together and Apart"	Dean Bennett	Heather Conkie	January 15, 2017	294709-10
Georgie looks for Tim, leaving Amy to comfort the trapped horse. Georgie finds Tim and Karen; Karen takes Tim to the hospital while Amy and Georgie stay with the trailer. Jack and Mitch arrive and free the horse though Amy is more concerned about the horse than her own well being. Peter questions Lou about Mitch and they talk about signing the divorce papers. Peter wants to help more while Lou works on the expansion of Maggie's. The next morning Amy and Georgie work with the horse and Lou and Peter sign their divorce papers. Lou makes Peter a birthday dinner and cake. Peter picks out a stone on the fireplace. Bob and Ty have to operate to save the bear cub. The villagers expect a reward for information about the poachers. After a long surgery, Bob and Ty save the bear cub and determine who the poachers are. After some missed attempts, Amy gets in contact with Ty but doesn't tell him everything that happened.
168	11	"Change of Course"	Norma Bailey	Pamela Pinch	January 22, 2017	294709-11
Tim goes to Amy's prenatal class. He is overly enthusiastic and Amy asks him not to come again. Margo, the prenatal coach tells Amy she is lucky to have such good support; Amy decides she wants Tim to accompany her to the rest of the classes. He agrees. Casey teaches a barrel racing clinic at Tim's rodeo school, and Georgie cannot get the hang of it. She takes the barrel racing horse, Morgan, back to Heartland where she and Amy work through her nerves. Jade calls barrel racing a 'stupid, girly sport' and Clay gets mad. At the end of the episode, Jade admits to Georgie that she likes Clay. Cass speculates on breaking up with Caleb after she sees him with another woman. Amy questions Caleb who admits that he is going to propose to Cass.
169	12	"Sound of Silence"	Norma Bailey	Ken Craw	February 5, 2017	294709-12
The barn in which Tim had Casey board out-of-town horses for a rodeo event is destroyed by a fire, with the fate of the horses unknown. Tim insists the rodeo continue for morale. Jade and Clay receive their Pro Rodeo cards and this high level of competition tests Jade.
170	13	"Home Sweet Home"	Gail Harvey	Bonnie Fairweather	February 12, 2017	294709-13
Lisa and Lou decide to hold a surprise baby shower for Amy. They both buy the same gift which causes a bit of tension between them. Mallory comes for a visit, but dodges all questions about why she is really there. Georgie notices that Mallory is ignoring calls from Jake, which makes her suspicious. Adam gets jealous that Georgie is talking to Clay and he snoops through her texts. He confronts Clay and punches him. Clay tells Georgie, who gets mad at Adam. She asks Adam why and he admits he read her texts. She breaks up with him and tells him she can't trust him.
171	14	"Written in the Stars"	Gail Harvey	Mark Haroun	February 19, 2017	294709-14
Lou and Mitch struggle to find the right time to tell the family about their relationship. Jake's unexpected arrival at Heartland forces Mallory to admit to Amy and Jack the real reason she returned. After breaking up with Adam, Georgie throws herself into helping Amy with an under-performing cutting horse which Scott brought to Heartland. Mallory and Jake decide to get married at Heartland.
172	15	"Forest for the Trees"	Eleanore Lindo	Ken Craw	March 5, 2017	294709-15
Amy struggles with the feeling that something is not right with Ty while she and Jack strive to help Ghost, a wild horse linked with Ty's past. Georgie goes on a date with Clay's cousin Wyatt McMurtry. Tim helps when Jade's plans fall through.
173	16	"A Long Shot"	Eleanore Lindo	Pamela Pinch	March 12, 2017	294709-16
Ty is bitten by a tick. Forced to work together for the afternoon, Tim gives Mitch a rough time when he learns of Lou and Mitch's relationship. Ty grows increasingly ill as he attempts to return to Amy. A secret from Jack's past threatens to change his relationship with the family. Georgie admits her true feelings for Adam.
174	17	"Dreamer"	Alison Reid	Mark Haroun	March 19, 2017	294709-17
On arrival back in the country, Ty is admitted to the hospital, bringing Amy and the family together. Georgie helps Olivia with her horse. Peter offers to help Lou with the Maggie's franchise.
175	18	"Greater Expectations"	Dean Bennett	Heather Conkie	March 26, 2017	294709-18
Amy goes into labor and the Heartland family welcomes a new baby. Caleb and Cassandra get married. Georgie tries to gentle Ghost without success, eventually giving up and letting him go. However, Ghost later returns to pay the new family a special visit and even allows Georgie to pet him before leaving again. Lou asks Mitch to be her plus-one at Caleb and Cassandra's wedding, denying that Peter's being at the ceremony would be awkward. However, Mitch arrives just in time to see Lou and Peter rush from the church holding hands and drive away (because Amy had gone into labor). The next day, Lou goes looking for Mitch and is distressed to see an empty lot where his trailer had been.

=== Season 11 (2017–18) ===
No. overall	No. in season	Title	Directed by	Written by	Original release date	Prod. code
176	1	"Baby on Board" "Brave New World"	Grant Harvey	Heather Conkie	September 24, 2017	310342-1
Amy and Ty are getting used to having a baby in their loft. Ty's mother pays a surprise visit to her new granddaughter. Ty is a control freak when it comes to parenting, and believes he's the only one who can care for Lyndy properly. He alienates Tim and Lily when he refuses his mom's gift and disagrees with Tim's idea of a baby gate. Lily confronts Ty about his distrust of her. Lily and Tim bond over their anger and decide to do something about the baby gate. Jack has a heart-to-heart with Ty, assuring him that he will be a good parent, unlike his own father. Ty apologizes to his mother and they reconcile. Ty, Amy and Lyndy finally have a "date" and dance in the back of Ty's truck, just as Ty and Amy did years before.
177	2	"Highs and Lows"	Grant Harvey	Mark Haroun	October 1, 2017	310342-2
Georgie's brother, Jeff, mails her a newspaper article with the name of the drunk driver who killed her parents. Georgie decides to go see him at his house, with Jade, and when leaving Georgie runs into his mailbox. He calls the police and forces Georgie to pay for the damages she caused. Jack and Tim pay the drunk driver, Charles Thackery, a visit, asking him to drop the charges; he asks them to leave. Peter flies in from Vancouver when he hears what Georgie is dealing with. Mr Thackery arrives at Heartland, asking to meet with Georgie. Georgie meets with Charles Thackery and tells him that he needs to become a better father.
178	3	"Decision Time"	Eleanore Lindo	Ken Craw	October 8, 2017	310342-3
Georgie has to choose between show jumping Flame or continuing with the Extreme Team. Tim accelerates Jade's training regimen when a new competitor appears. Amy and Ty try to maintain a social life as new parents. Mitch confides to Jack about his move to Calgary.
179	4	"Hard to Say Goodbye"	Eleanore Lindo	Heather Conkie	October 15, 2017	310342-4
Amy helps prepare a Mongolian horse for travel, leaving his mare and foal in Canada. While training with Flame, Georgie is distracted by Wyatt's return. Jack and Lisa clash as they discuss the next step in their relationship.
180	5	"Measuring Up"	Ken Filewych	Bonnie Fairweather	October 22, 2017	310342-5
Upon her return from New York, Lou presents Georgie with a decision to continue show jump training in New York. Jack and Lisa adjust to living together. Lou interviews for help at the diner. Amy struggles to take care of Lyndy while Ty is away. Caleb makes a mistake at the rodeo school.
181	6	"Strange Bedfellows"	Pierre Tremblay	Pamela Pinch	November 5, 2017	310342-6
Amy is asked to work with Lisa's racehorse. When information is revealed about the horse's breeding, conflict arises. Wyatt's mother, Jen, throws a party at Maggie's in honour of Lou's success. Georgie convinces Adam to be Wyatt's math tutor. Mitch makes a tough decision about his relationship with Lou.
182	7	"Our Sons and Daughters"	Chris Potter	Mark Haroun	November 12, 2017	310342-7
Amy tries to teach the son of some old friends about the power of connecting to a horse. Georgie, Adam and Wyatt go on a road trip. Peter worries when Katie doesn't come home from a trail ride.
183	8	"Truth Be Told"	Chris Potter	Ken Craw	November 19, 2017	310342-8
Georgie continues to be confused about her relationship with Wyatt. Amy takes on a show jumper and suspects the horse is better suited to becoming a broncho. When Tim's erratic behavior sparks concern from his loved ones, Jack suspects something else is going on.
184	9	"Challenges"	Bruce McDonald	Heather Conkie	December 3, 2017	310342-9
Amy tries to get everything at Heartland organized before joining Ty on a work-related journey back to Mongolia.
185	10	"A Fine Balance"	Bruce McDonald	Alexandra Clarke & Heather Conkie	January 7, 2018	310342-10
Ty finds himself in a dangerous situation, and Amy must turn to an unexpected source for guidance to save him. Georgie's confidence for an upcoming competition is shaken by Val. Mitch and Peter work together to take care of a cranky Lyndy.
186	11	"Somewhere in Between"	Rachel Leiterman	Mark Haroun	January 14, 2018	310342-11
Amy works with a former racehorse in need of a new owner. Jack comes out of his comfort zone to support Lisa. Tim is forced to open up to Casey while at the veterinary clinic for an emergency. Wyatt returns with a warning for Georgie.
187	12	"Out of the Shadow"	Rachel Leiterman	Ken Craw	January 21, 2018	310342-12
Jade is offered a scholarship in Texas. Tim rallies the family to undertake another memorial ride for Marion. After Val questions Amy's coaching abilities, Georgie decides to discontinue riding for her. At the memorial, Tim states his deepest regret of not saying he is sorry to Marion. Tim divulges to Lou and Amy that he had an MRI that shows an inconclusive result.
188	13	"Reunion"	Alison Reid	Alexandra Clarke	January 28, 2018	310342-13
Lou throws herself into planning her high school reunion to impress an old rival. Jack and Amy are concerned about Tim's initial medical scan. Amy tells Georgie to get closer to Phoenix. Lou and Scott reminisce after the school reunion.
189	14	"Past Imperfect"	Alison Reid	Pamela Pinch	February 4, 2018	310342-14
Lou asks Scott about their relationship. Ty and Amy are disturbed when they find someone has broken into their home. Lou recalls her marriage and dating relationship troubles. Georgie tells Adam about Wyatt and herself. During a second meeting with an illegal wildlife trader, law enforcement arrives and recovers a hard drive with evidence.
190	15	"Strength of Bonds"	Rachel Leiterman	Ken Craw	March 11, 2018	310342-15
As Thanksgiving approaches, Georgie convinces Amy to work with a dangerously high-strung jumping horse. Lisa asks Lou to reveal the family stuffing recipe. Georgie reluctantly tells Jade that Tim had a brain scan. Jade tells Tim that she will return to be coached by him.
191	16	"A Place to Call Home"	Rachel Leiterman	Pamela Pinch	March 18, 2018	310342-16
A training accident results in a serious injury and Georgie feels conflicted when an unlikely ally arrives at Heartland to show support.
192	17	"Doubt"	Megan Follows	Mark Haroun	April 1, 2018	310342-17
Georgie reconsiders her future in both staying in Hudson and show jumping after a video goes viral. Amy and Ty are of differing opinions about what to do with their new land. A lucrative business opportunity puts Jack, Mitch and Tim at odds. Lou struggles with how to support her daughter through a difficult time.
193	18	"Naming Day"	Dean Bennett	Heather Conkie	April 8, 2018	310342-18
Days before Lyndy's naming ceremony, the family finds themselves keeping secrets.

=== Season 12 (2019) ===
No. overall	No. in season	Title	Directed by	Written by	Original release date	Prod. code
194	1	"Dare to Dream"	Chris Potter	Heather Conkie	January 6, 2019	355959-1
Amy and Ty face figuring out family time and work time, and take inspiration from healing a wild mare and her foal. Lisa is concerned about her Aunt Evelyn's whereabouts. Lou comes home with news of selling the Maggie's diner in New York City. Tim sells his ranch. Georgie struggles to decide whether to be interviewed by an equestrian magazine. Tim wants to propose marriage to Casey. Mitch tells Lou he is dating again.
195	2	"Hearts Run Free"	Chris Potter	Heather Conkie	January 13, 2019	355959-2
Amy and Ty plan a romantic trip to Pike River. Tim tells Lou that he decided not to propose marriage to Casey. He moves into Heartland, causing tension with Jack. Jack tags along on Amy and Ty's trip, to visit Will Vernon and sets a deadline for Tim to move out of Heartland by the time he returns. Georgie trains intensely with Phoenix to prove to a potential coach that they're a great team. Lou wavers on her decision regarding Maggie's diner in New York City.
196	3	"Just Breathe"	Megan Follows	Ken Craw	January 20, 2019	355959-3
Ty is asked to mentor Luke, a troubled kid, and struggles to find common ground. Lou organizes a horse yoga retreat at the Dude Ranch. She is surprised when she learns who the instructor is and this subsequently leads to hijinks between Georgie and Wyatt. Amy works with a restless yoga horse and learns the real reason her father is so keen on helping Jack and Ty build a treehouse for Lyndy.
197	4	"Risk and Reward"	Megan Follows	Ken Craw	January 27, 2019	355959-4
Amy and Ty take Lyndy on her first camping trip, during which they find an injured animal. When Jade takes a bad fall in a bronco riding accident, Tim and Georgie must convince her to see a doctor. Georgie starts working with her new coach, whose advice causes her to question her priorities. Tim makes a nuisance of himself in his new home, drawing criticism from Jack. Caleb returns and comes into conflict with Tim.
198	5	"Change of Heart"	Pierre Trembley	Pamela Pinch	February 10, 2019	1355959-5
Georgie enlists Wyatt's help in reuniting a famous trick rider with her long-lost horse. When Clint brings Luke back to Heartland, it is up to Amy and Ty to find a way to connect with him. Tim crosses a line at Heartland and Jack loses patience with his new housemate.
199	6	"Diamond in the Rough"	Ken Filewych	Mark Haroun	February 17, 2019	355959-6
The new manager at Fairfield Stables comes to Amy and Ty with an unusual concern that one of the trainers has been training the manager's horse to hurt her. Amy and Ty look into it, but Amy and Ty have different opinions of how best to treat her horse. Amy and Ty determine that the horse is poisoned by Locoweed.
200	7	"Running Scared"	Chris Potter	Ken Craw	March 3, 2019	355959-7
Jade is cleared to return to the rodeo. Amy and Tim organize a team penning event for the family and closest friends. Amy agrees to help Caleb with his horse that is acting out. Amy agrees with Tim to have events for the town. Amy realizes Caleb does not have a horse problem. Georgie tries to help Jade conquer her newfound fear of riding.
201	8	"Stress Fractures"	Rachel Leiterman	Alexandra Clarke	March 10, 2019	355959-8
Lou returns permanently to Heartland. Amy and Ty's suspicions are raised when a Fairfield horse wins a race despite an injury. Lou asks Mitch to assist in changing the Dude Ranch into an unconventional pioneer excursion to attract guests. Georgie dedicates herself to training causing a massive toll on her relationship with Wyatt. Jack struggles to put together a homecoming present for Lisa.
202	9	"Long Road Back"	Eleanore Lindo	Ken Craw	March 24, 2019	355959-09
Amy and Ty work together to treat a doped racehorse. When it turns into a race against the clock, Amy looks to an unexpected source for help. Georgie pushes herself to a breaking point and Lou and Peter must help her pick up the pieces. Jack is at odds with Tim when Tim attempts to usurp his place at the head of the cattle drive.
203	10	"All Hearts Lead Home"	Eleanore Lindo	Heather Conkie	March 31, 2019	355959-10
The family finds ways to cope with their grief of Will's death. Jack retreats to his fishing cabin, where thoughts of his old friend Will save him from death. Ty helps Luke with a school project, but talking to him about Amy's grief leads to new discoveries about Luke's home life. Lou struggles to let go while Mitch's wedding approaches. Tim is left to consider his decisions.
204	11	"Room to Grow"	Dean Bennett	Mark Haroun	April 7, 2019	355959-11
When Jack learns that Will Vernon's wild horses are in danger of being slaughtered, the family rallies to bring them home. Amy and Ty face an important decision regarding Luke, but news from Clint that Luke will be placed in foster care may change everything. While Lou tries to hold her peace about Mitch's wedding, Tim's goading weakens her resolve. Georgie wrestles with a decision that could take her away from her family, and Jack and Lisa reconnect after their time apart.

=== Season 13 (2019) ===
No. overall	No. in season	Title	Directed by	Written by	Original release date	Prod. code
205	1	"Snakes and Ladders"	Ken Filewych	Heather Conkie	September 22, 2019	163758-14
Amy and Ty have started the construction of their house on the land Jack gave them while living in the loft with Lyndy and Luke. Their horse business is successful but hectic and they have to turn away Kirk, a horse owner who had waited for an appointment. Kirk becomes unhappy and lies on the Internet about their encounter, affecting the business. Amy and Ty disagree about doing business with Kirk but decide to help him before their business is further hurt. Tim wears out his welcome at the house and spins a story to switch places with Amy and Ty. Georgie and Phoenix return from Europe but Phoenix has an infectious disease. Amy talks Ty into quarantining him at Heartland, which shuts down the ranch and their business. Jack helps Luke to become part of the family.
206	2	"Wild One"	Pierre Tremblay	Mark Haroun	September 29, 2019	163758-15
Amy and Jack round up Will's wild horses into a pen where Ty can treat them. Heartland's new neighbour Sam asks Jack to have Amy gentle one of the wild horses. Sam picks a colt that Amy is not sure she can gentle. Amy tries to tell Sam that the colt, whom Sam names Caz, is not the best choice, but he is adamant that it is the one he wants, doubles the money offered, and promises more business if she can do it. Kirk continues causing issues for Amy and Ty's business. Amy and Ty help Luke understand why his mother cannot see him. Georgie informs her coach that she does not want to train while Phoenix is recovering. Georgie and Peter attend a university open house, where Georgie sees Wyatt for the first time since she returned from her European trip. Tim is jealous of Jack's appearance in a Garland advertisement. Amy, Ty, Luke and Lyndy settle into the ranch house.
207	3	"Rearview Mirror"	Megan Follows	Ken Craw	October 6, 2019	163758-16
Jade gets a new horse but it has problems and gives Amy something to do since Kirk is still hurting her business. Caleb tells Jade that the seller of the horse has sold injured horses before. Luke finds the root cellar at the ranch house. Mention of the cellar brings back Jack's painful memories of his sister June, affecting Jack's decisions and his treatment of Georgie. Katie treats Luke poorly since returning. Lou and Mitch sneak around because they have not told Katie they are dating. Caleb and Ty devise a plan to catch the seller doping his horses. Jade and Amy enter a roping jackpot after treating Jade's horse. Amy confronts Jack and discovers that Jack blames himself for June's death.
208	4	"The Eye of the Storm"	Megan Follows	Heather Conkie & Alexandra Clarke	October 13, 2019	163758-17
Ty blames himself for taking Kirk as a client and the resulting problems. Ty leaves to smooth things over with Kirk when a storm hits Heartland. Jack's memories resurface as they shelter in the root cellar. Lou confronts Georgie about college while sheltering at the Dude Ranch. Luke worries about his horse being set loose for the storm. Jack talks about what happened to June and how it changed his life. Ty helps Kirk get his panicking horse out of its barn. Jack comes to terms with what happened to June, and Kirk and Ty come to an understanding.
209	5	"Fairytale"	Eleanore Lindo	Mark Haroun	October 20, 2019	163758-18
Luke's mother unexpectedly visits Heartland and gives Luke a drone. Amy and Ty worry about the impact the surprise visit will have on Luke. Tim suspects that Sam has stolen his horse, Champ; Tim borrows Luke's drone to aid in the investigation.
210	6	"A Time to Remember"	Eleanore Lindo	Ken Craw	October 27, 2019	163758-19
Georgie's graduation arrives along with Quinn, a close friend from her European trip.
211	7	"The Art of Trust"	Chris Potter	Alexandra Clarke	November 3, 2019	163758-20
Caleb intrudes upon Jack and Lisa's semi-private retreat. Amy is asked to spend time at an art retreat to work with an artist's allegedly erratic horse. Georgie and Quinn track a missing horse. Cass reveals she's pregnant to Caleb.
212	8	"Legacy"	Chris Potter	Ken Craw	November 10, 2019	163758-21
Tim is organizing a rodeo show when his old flame, Casey, returns to ask him to take over her rodeo business. Jack encourages other retired rodeo stars to attend the show, but finds several are incapacitated due to injuries from their past profession. Jack initiates a program to help fund the retirement of the rodeo competitors. Lou announces that she is running for mayor of Hudson.
213	9	"Fight or Flight"	Kristin Lehman	Mark Haroun	November 17, 2019	163758-22
Wildlife is becoming a community problem. Amy and Ty receive news about Luke's mother. Lou's election campaign suffers from suspicious roadblocks. Ty discovers helpful information about problems caused by the large housing development of Lou's opponent, J.D. Werth. Amy has to face an upsetting truth about Spartan's future. Georgie tries to help find a new horse for the ranch. Luke returns to his mother's care. Georgie goes on a road trip to meet Quinn.
214	10	"The Passing of the Torch"	Dean Bennett	Heather Conkie	November 24, 2019	163758-23
Snares and traps from J. D.'s poacher are killing and injuring farm animals, pets, and wildlife in the area. Georgie receives an undesired response from Quinn. Lou confronts J. D. about his development which disturbs the wildlife corridor. Facing challenges on many fronts, the family members draw on each other for support. Amy and Ty are shot by a single stray bullet from the poacher. On election day, Quinn comes to see Georgie and Lou is declared the winner. The ex-mayoral candidate J.D. Werth and his henchman are arrested and charged for shooting at Amy and Ty. Mitch leaves Lou. Amy attempts to gentle a wild colt who bolted from his herd.

=== Season 14 (2021) ===
No. overall	No. in season	Title	Directed by	Written by	Original release date	Prod. code
215	1	"Keep Me in Your Heart"	Pierre Tremblay	Heather Conkie	January 10, 2021	163758-24
One year later, Amy is dealing with the upheaval of her life since Ty's death. Lou copes with the reality of being the mayor of Hudson. Mitch has rejoined Lou. Georgie revisits her Olympic dream.
216	2	"The Last Goodbye"	Directed and edited by : Ken Filewych	Mark Haroun	January 17, 2021	163758-25
Jade brings her stepsister, Parker, and new horse, Mickey, to stay at Heartland. Amy faces dual efforts of properly leaving loved ones—helping Parker connect with Mickey by giving Mickey the opportunity to be at peace leaving the former caretaker, and Amy having proper closure of a recurring dream of Ty leaving. Jack and Tim take Jade and Quinn on the Fall cattle drive, which raises difficult memories for Jack, when Ty earned Jack's respect. Lou faces harsh political criticism.
217	3	"Making Amends"	Chris Potter	Heather Conkie and Alexandra Clarke	January 24, 2021	163758-26
Amy is upset when Ty's mother, Lily, shows up—Lily hadn't communicated with Amy in a year; nor attended Ty's funeral. Amy grudgingly helps Lily with Wade's traumatized racehorse. Lou gets into even more difficulty when she tries to promote Hudson as a "must see" tourist destination. Amy names the wild colt Shadow.
218	4	"Through the Smoke"	Chris Potter	Ken Craw	January 31, 2021	163758-27
A train derails and causes an explosion that threatens Hudson. A wildfire spreads toward the rodeo grounds, where Amy rushes to save the horses.
219	5	"Outsiders"	Winnifred Jong	Ken Craw	February 14, 2021	163758-28
The wild, black stallion that Amy brought from Will's ranch is brutally forced out of the herd by its new leader, Caz. Amy is left to track the injured horse and nurse him back to health. Lou’s old boss in New York, Jessica Cook, vacations at the Dude Ranch. She tells Lou that her cancer is in remission, that she quit her job to concentrate on photography, and that she is extending her stay at the Dude Ranch.
220	6	"The New Normal"	Winnifred Jong	Alexandra Clarke	February 21, 2021	163758-29
A group of wild horses is in need of new homes. Amy determines to return to her Miracle Girl roots and host her first horse clinic in more than a year. Lisa and Jack, the spokesman for Heartland Beef, attend a grocery convention in Calgary with Fred Garland.
221	7	"Courage"	Jill Carter	Mark Haroun	February 28, 2021	163758-30
Tim seeks help from an unlikely person when he finds himself competing in a polo match. At Heartland, Quinn announces that Georgie has a chance of making it to the Canadian Equestrian Young Riders team, which could lead to her making it to the Canadian Olympics team. Amy is concerned that her daughter isn't adjusting well to her new surroundings. Amy makes a decision that worries Jack.
222	8	"Changing Gears"	Jill Carter	Ken Craw	March 7, 2021	163758-31
Caleb finds Ty's motorcycle that he believes will have special meaning for Amy. Surprisingly, it is Jack who has mixed emotions stirred by the gift. Caleb is told he's a better bronc teacher than a rider, by Tim, after Caleb teaches Jade—she stays on a bronc over 8 seconds, the same bronc that threw Caleb. Caleb enlightens Jessica on how to capture the heart of a bronc rider in her photography.
223	9	"Find Me in the Dark"	Michelle Morgan	Mark Haroun	March 14, 2021	163758-32
Quinn's wealthy father arrives at Heartland with a life-changing proposition for Amy and his son. Tim gifts Jessica with a dark room after spending much time with her, but she tells him that she can’t accept the gift; she says goodbye to Tim and departs Heartland.
224	10	"Staying the Course"	Dean Bennett	Heather Conkie	March 21, 2021	163758-33
Amy works with a challenging horse and revives a dream to rebuild her old jumping course after she sees it while riding Shadow. Jessica returns and tells Tim that it was unfair of her to bolt. She says that her plan is to travel. Tim supports her plan; Jessica invites Tim to travel with her, and they kiss. Peter tells Lou that he can't attend her wedding, because he still has feelings for her. Lou calls off her wedding to Mitch when he tells her that he wants kids, and Lou tells him that she still has feelings for Peter.

=== Season 15 (2021) ===
No. overall	No. in season	Title	Directed by	Written by	Original release date	Prod. code
225	1	"Moving Toward the Light"	Pierre Tremblay	Heather Conkie	October 17, 2021	163758-34
Amy struggles with Lyndy attending a week-long preschool prep camp. Amy meets and works with Renaud Perez's head trainer, Sylvie from Dark Horse, whom he hired after Amy turned down the position. Fred Garland looks to convince Tim and Jack to buy Mitch's herd. Lou is upset that Mitch did not tell her he was selling the herd, as well as Aspen Grove. Tim and Jessica return from Peru and make a big announcement, which surprises the whole family. Jack and Lisa make important decisions about the future. Sylvie works with Lyndy, Jack, and Harley on a surprise for Amy's birthday. Lou struggles with moving on from both Mitch and Peter.
226	2	"Runaway"	Ken Filewych	Mark Haroun	October 24, 2021	163758-35
Jessica notices a wild horse she likes. Lisa looks to buy a high-end racehorse. Amy and Sam search for the wild stallion when it runs away after a robbery at Sam’s place. Tim returns to the rodeo school and he and Caleb disagree with how to run the business and teach the students. Katie and Parker work hard to convince Lou they are not too young to babysit Lyndy. Jessica asks Lou if she can sell her photos at Maggie’s. Lisa feels like Lou and Amy treat her like their nanny. Mayor Lou’s Chief Administrative Officer and assistant Rick Adderly has to look after Katie, Parker, and Lyndy. Lou and Amy try to make things right with Lisa at Jack’s urging.
227	3	"Bad Moon Rising"	Chris Potter	Ken Craw	October 31, 2021	163758-36
Amy reveals she plans to gentle the wild horse Jessica liked. After another break-in, Lisa talks to Jack about installing a security system. Amy works with kids at the horse therapy center when Cooper’s horse trainer quits. Lou and Rick discuss what to do about the break-ins. Paula Westfield complicates things for Lou and the center. Clint arrives at the center after receiving calls about the kids being involved in the robberies. One of the kids at the center, Logan, shows to have good sense about horses. Lou tries to help Cooper with the center and a gala he is planning to raise money. Jack does not respond well when Lisa and Lou ask about a watch he has. The family returns from the gala to find the house ransacked.
228	4	"Sins of a Father"	Chris Potter	Alexandra Clarke	November 7, 2021	163758-37
Tim’s All-Around Cowboy trophy and Jack’s father’s watch are stolen; Tim and Parker search online to find the items. Jack, angered by the robbery, dismantles the security system and installs new locks. Logan and Amy gentle the wild horse for Jessica; Logan meets the family and has dinner with them. Cooper leaves the horse therapy center when the kids there are accused of the robberies and donors drop out. Clint decides to temporarily run the center. Amy teaches Logan to ride a horse, and Jack teaches Lyndy to fish.
229	5	"Blood and Water"	Kristin Lehman	Ken Craw	November 14, 2021	163758-38
After Jack buys Mitch’s herd, Jack, Tim, Amy, Lou, Jessica, and Fred Garland go on a cattle drive that also serves as a photo shoot for Heartland Beef. Parker and Katie babysit Lyndy. Lou sends a text to Peter, saying he was the reason that she called off her marriage to Mitch. Tim and Jessica, who married while in Peru, decide to have a small reception for the family.
230	6	"Happy Ever After"	Kristin Lehman	Heather Conkie and Alexandra Clarke	November 21, 2021	163758-39
The small party Jessica wants for the family becomes a wedding ceremony that includes Logan, Jade, Parker, and Caleb. Logan and Amy present Jessica with Tim’s gift—the wild horse that they gentled. Peter tells Lou that he wants to get back together with her, but Lou says that she is not ready. Parker tells Jade that Logan is her boyfriend.
231	7	"Bluebird"	Michelle Morgan	Mark Haroun	November 28, 2021	163758-40
Rick Adderly’s mother, birdwatcher Gladys, is a guest at the Dude Ranch because Lou told her that she would be able to photograph a mountain bluebird. Amy sees poacher Grady, who shot her and Ty, working at a gas station. She tells Jack; Jack tells Tim, and they both go to the gas station. Grady shows no remorse, and Tim hits him. Amy is angry with Tim, saying that Grady was aiming at a wolf, not her and Ty. She goes to the gas station and tells Grady that Tim should not have hit him. Grady says it was an accident that she and Ty were shot; he was following J.D. Werth’s orders. Amy replies that she has moved on and so should he.
232	8	"Brand New Day"	Michelle Morgan	Ken Craw	December 5, 2021	163758-41
Amy and Lou meet Al Cotter and his grandson farrier Finn Cotter; Al plans to enter his Clydesdale Butch in Hudson’s Lumberjack Games. While Al demonstrates for Amy Butch’s routine for the Games, Amy discovers that Butch is blind in his left eye and offers to train him to compete. Al and Jack knew each other before Jack’s marriage and are frosty toward each other. Spartan’s arthritis prevents Amy from riding him; Finn fits him with new horseshoes that ease his arthritic pain. Caleb, Sam, Tim, Al, Finn, and Fred Garland’s brother Evan compete in the Lumberjack Games.
233	9	"The Long Game"	Gloria Kim	Mark Haroun	December 12, 2021	163758-42
Amy, Caleb, and Evan Garland enter an endurance race. Jack buys a dangerous horse, Blue, from his friend Stumpy and is determined to gentle him without Amy’s help. Lou and Katie go on a camping trip, where Lou plans to tell Katie that she and Peter may get back together. However, Lou changes her mind when Katie tells her that she is happy with her life.
234	10	"Leaving a Legacy"	Dean Bennett	Heather Conkie	December 19, 2021	163758-43
Ty's mother Lily sends Amy her racehorse Howler's winnings, which are rather substantial. Logan is considering dropping out of high school to work, so Amy offers to give him Ty's college course book. As she searches for the book, she sees a gift and card that Ty bought her for their 6th wedding anniversary. He wrote that he and Amy could leave a legacy. Because the horse therapy center is lacking the funds to stay open, Amy decides to donate some of Lily's winnings to the center, naming it the Dr. Ty Borden Equestrian Youth Center. Clint decides to run it permanently and tells Logan that he can live and work at the center, rather than the group home if he stays in school; Logan agrees. Peter and Lou tell Katie that they are back together, and Lisa's racehorse Platinum Bow wins the Kentucky Derby.

=== Season 16 (2022–23) ===
No. overall	No. in season	Title	Directed by	Written by	Original release date	Prod. code
235	1	"Something's Got to Give"	Ken Filewych	Heather Conkie	October 2, 2022	163758-44
Amy is helping Lyndy practice liberty training with Harley. Lyndy watches Amy halt Copper by raising her hands above her head. Amy and Lyndy stop on their way to the youth center after a pickup and horse trailer run off the road. Amy tells Lyndy to stay in the truck as the horse is loose, but Lyndy gets out and halts the horse by raising her arms like she saw Amy do. Amazed bystanders record the event. The horse, Moondance, belongs to Peyton Westfield. Lisa is traveling with Platinum Bow. Lou and Katie return from being in Vancouver with Peter. Katie is disappointed that Tim and Jessica are still staying in her room due to a plumbing problem in the loft. Jessica starts having issues with her horse, Flash. The video of Lyndy and Amy with Moondance goes viral and affects Amy's business. Miss Clarissa makes a big deal about it and it also causes Lyndy's classmates to be jealous of her. Amy is stretching herself thin between Heartland and the center. Jessica and Tim are upset Jack has not fixed the plumbing problem yet; Jessica feels penned in in the loft. Paula Westfield does not want Amy working with Moondance. Flash runs away. Rick tells Lou he and Carl have decided to adopt a baby. Peyton asks Amy to work with Moondance.
236	2	"Changes"	Ken Filewych	Mark Haroun	October 9, 2022	163758-45
Amy works with Peyton and Moondance at Heartland. Katie checks calves with Jack and they bring an abandoned one home. Logan is really upset when he finds out Amy is working for a Westfield. Katie struggles with feeling like she does not belong in Vancouver or at Heartland. Amy seeks reasons for Moondance's behavior from a trainer at Westfield Stables. Rick works up the nerve to ask Lou to be a personal reference for him for adoption. Katie looks through boxes of her great-grandmother Lyndy’s items after Jack tells her she reminds him of Lyndy; Jack also gives her Lyndy’s journals. Miss Clarissa tells Jack that Lyndy’s graduation outfit somehow ended up in the garbage. Logan gets upset at Katie. Lou’s interview about Rick does not go as planned. Lyndy helps feed the calf and goes to drastic measures to try to stop it from leaving.
237	3	"On the Ropes"	Pierre Tremblay	Ken Craw	October 16, 2022	163758-46
Tim gives Champ a break and rides Blue against Jack’s advice and is thrown off. Sam donates hay bales to the rodeo school and gives Caleb permission to try to turn one of the wild horses, Hawk, into a rope horse; Amy helps him after he has some trouble. Katie is tired of Lou sending her pictures and videos from Vancouver and just wants Lou to talk to her. Katie wants to go rafting with Logan after his friend cancels even though Parker would rather go for a picnic. Tim talks to Jack about selling Blue, thinking he can only handle one rider, but Jack does not want to and is backed by Amy. Katie takes advantage of Lou being distracted to get false permission to go rafting. Tim hires an extra hand but has an ulterior motive that involves Blue. Logan and Katie grow closer while rafting. Parker sets up a picnic for the three of them, but Logan and Katie get caught in the rapids and have an accident. Parker calls for help and Jack and Amy rescue them.
238	4	"Spark to Flame"	Chris Potter	Alexandra Clarke	October 23, 2022	163758-47
Jack wants to hire extra hands to help move the herd to the summer pasture, but Tim disagrees. Lou receives a letter informing her that Heartland Beef won Hudson's entrepreneur of the year award which has a negative effect on her mayoral rating and business even though she did not choose the winner. Lisa returns to Heartland. Amy sees Finn at Maggie's who has been away from Hudson for months and did not tell her he was leaving. Fred Garland receives Jack and Tim's approval on a newspaper ad for Heartland Beef after winning the award. Lou suggests to Katie that they take a trip to Florida to surprise Georgie, but Katie wants to stay in Hudson for the summer. Jessica receives an offer from Ezra to show her photos in a gallery in New York. Lou decides Katie should waitress at Maggie's for the summer, and Katie convinces Parker to work with her. Finn asks Amy for help with his horse, Tucker, who is frightened of being shoed, and she agrees. A man from Tim's oil field past shows up and threatens his business, forcing Tim to own up to past mistakes. Finn finally apologizes to Amy. Lou receives a call from Quinn who tells her that Georgie had an accident at her show and is in the hospital unconscious. Jessica shows Tim a photo of Amy and Finn looking at each other fondly.
239	5	"Higher Ground"	Kristin Lehman	Heather Conkie	October 30, 2022	163758-48
A flash flood in Roseville, Alberta, is shown on the news where a state of emergency has been issued. Scott helps lift a horse, Biscuit, out of water by strapping him to a helicopter which transports him to near Hudson. Amy takes Biscuit to Heartland, and his owners David and Emily arrive and also stay for a few days. Lou lets Jack and Lisa know how Georgie’s back surgery went. Hudson is overrun with evacuees from Roseville; Rick tries to figure out how to accommodate them in Lou’s absence with the family’s help. Jack gets upset when Lisa’s trainer asks her to fly to Florida to look at a horse. Lisa lets some families from Roseville stay at the dude ranch with Tim’s reluctant help. Tim also tries to help Rick prepare for an on-air plea for help for the evacuees. David and Emily struggle to figure out how to move forward after losing their dog and house; Lisa offers them jobs at Fairfield which Jack disagrees with. Tim helps a man from Roseville in an unexpected way, then calls someone he has not talked to in years.
240	6	"Into the Wild"	Kristin Lehman	Alexandra Clarke	November 6, 2022	163758-49
The Wild Animal Adventure Zoo has shut down due to animal-rights violations. Parker, who worked at the zoo, tells Amy that a problem horse needs Amy’s services. The "horse" is actually a zorse (part horse, part zebra). Amy brings the zorse to Heartland to tame and rehome him. Jessica’s friend Ezra arranges an art show of her photography in New York City, so she and Tim travel there. While there, Tim contacts his son Shane, who works in Philadelphia as a law clerk, asking Shane to visit him. Shane texts back that he is unable to see Tim; however, he later shows up at the art show, and father and son have a long-overdue reunion. Jessica is crestfallen when Ezra tells her that art collectors she expected did not appear at her show because her photographs solely depict ranch life.
241	7	"Vigil"	Gloria Kim	Mark Haroun	November 13, 2022	163758-50
A severe thunderstorm claims the life of the horse Copper. Amy notifies Mallory, who arrives at Heartland with Jake to attend a memorial for the horse. Jake and Mallory live in Colorado but are having financial difficulties because Jake lost his job as a ranch foreman. While at Heartland, Mallory learns that she is pregnant; Jack contacts a friend in Colorado, who gives Jake a job. Finn tells Amy that he must leave again to help out a friend’s father in Kindersley. Lou notices Katie's open journal and reads that Katie has a crush on an older boy. Initially, Katie is angry with Lou, but although she accepts Lou's apology, she does not share the name of the older boy.
242	8	"Running Down a Dream"	Gloria Kim	Ken Craw	November 20, 2022	163758-51
Amy teaches an enthusiastic Lyndy to barrel race, and when Caleb learns that legendary barrel racer Sherri Wild is selling her barrel racing school, Amy teaches him, too. Sherri sells her school to Tim and Caleb so they can expand their rodeo school. Logan's father Greg is released from prison and wants Logan to move to Nova Scotia with him, but Logan convinces his dad that Hudson is his home. Jessica is wary of submitting her photos for a possible advertising job because of her disappointing show in New York. Tim creates a portfolio of her photos, and after seeing the collection, Jessica submits her work and lands the advertising job for designer Grayson Bolt.
243	9	"True Colours, New Tricks"	Melanie Scrofano	Caitlin D. Fryers	November 27, 2022	163758-52
Clothes designer Grayson Bolt has difficulty creating his new collection, so Jessica invites him to Heartland, hoping the getaway will inspire him. At Heartland, Grayson meets Amy, who tells him that a long trail ride helps clear her head. Tim, Jessica, Amy, Jack, and Grayson head out the next day for an overnight trail ride joined by Jessica's friend Ezra, who is an investor in Grayson's label. Lou hosts a luncheon at Maggie's to thank the flood volunteers, but during the planning, Rick feels left out.
244	10	"Lurking in the Shadows"	Michelle Morgan	Ken Craw	December 4, 2022	163758-53
Amy learns from a client that a woman claiming to be the Miracle Girl is impersonating Amy. Lou and Amy travel to Glidden, Saskatchewan, to meet the woman, Jolene, and give her a cease-and-desist letter. Caleb tells Jack and Tim that Cassandra is divorcing him. Jack is seriously injured during a showcase at Tim and Caleb's Rodeo School. Because Lou and Amy are close to Kindersley, Amy decides to call on Finn. When a woman answers the door and says that Finn is out, Amy hurriedly leaves.
245	11	"Head Over Heels"	Madison Thomas	Caitlin D. Fryers and Adam Hussein	January 8, 2023	163758-54
Jack recovers from his rodeo injuries. Tim and Caleb look for Mike, Tim’s bitter ex co-worker, who sabotaged the rodeo and was behind the “accident” where Jack was injured. Logan meets Miley (granddaughter of legendary barrel racer Sherri Wild) at a Dressage practice while she struggles with her horse Journey. The sparks fly between them. Lisa steps up to help Jack manage Heartland Beef while he nurses his injuries.Tim meets up with Mike for a major confrontation. Lyndy continues her barrel racing training, while tension continues to build between Katie and Lou.
246	12	"Memory"	Madison Thomas	Mark Haroun	January 15, 2023	163758-55
Lisa, Jack and Katie head up to the fishing cabin. Lisa has plans to fix up the cabin. Amy learns that the woman from Finn's house, Kristi, needed help for her horse. When Amy tries to refuse, she learns that Kristi was the sister to the dead friend so Amy couldn't refuse. Peter shows up, with another new look, and grows surprised to learn that he can't have a romantic weekend with Lou. Lou digs into Georgie's business in between hosting Rick for dinner.
247	13	"Striking a Balance"	Chris Potter	Ken Craw	January 22, 2023	163758-56
Lisa's investors want her to sell Platinum Bow if he can't back on track to race, so Amy is called in to help. At Maggie’s Diner, the workers are on strike, demanding more staff. Caleb is hiding from his family about his separation. Tim takes a road trip to meet up with his son Shane at a corporate retreat. Jack picks up his guitar, but keeps it kind of private. Lou opens up on a radio broadcast interview.
248	14	"Learning to Fly" "After the Ever After"	Chris Potter	Alexandra Clarke	January 29, 2023	163758-57
Georgie is back in town. Yes, she is still alive, and she is real, but what is she doing back? Caleb is struggling with the Rodeo School’s numbers and with his young son Carson, can a new mascot help? Jessica gets her “Cowboy Shoot” photo portfolio back, but it has been heavily modified. Tim throws her a local life line to boost her photography career. Peter finally figures out what he wants to be when he grows up- “The new Mitch”. Lou launches the brand new Hudson Winter Festival and Jade reappears- even if remotely.
249	15	"A Light in the Dark"	Dean Bennett	Heather Conkie	February 5, 2023	163758-58
Lou plans up a “commitment ceremony” to show off her love to Peter. Outside, Cazz the leader of the wild horses, has found a new intruder to chase off. Lyndy wants Amy to help this new horse Xavier (Theo), somehow. Jack revisits the basement, and with it his dark past while Al Cotter comes back to haunt him, again. Lisa closes the Platinum Bow deal to make her the sole owner. Quinn pays Georgie a visit. In this season’s conclusion, we see them all shining bright in the light.

=== Season 17 (2023) ===
No. overall	No. in season	Title	Directed by	Written by	Original release date	Prod. code
250	1	"The Path Less Traveled"	Dean Bennett	Mark Haroun	October 1, 2023	163758-59
Amy is surprised when Mallory shows up very obviously pregnant at the ranch with a wild horse. Jack and Tim face new competition and Lou grapples with a familiar opponent in her campaign.
251	2	"Taking the Reins"	Ken Filewych	Ken Craw	October 8, 2023	163758-60
Amy and Jack re-train Edwin's horse which brings Amy and Edwin closer. Logan takes on his first client horse. Election night arrives for Lou just as the family faces a difficult loss.
252	3	"The Heart Wants"	Chris Potter	Caitlin D. Fryers	October 15, 2023	163758-61
Amy helps Caleb with his son's pony. Lou and Jessica start a new venture, while Katie tries a new risky hobby. Disaster strikes when Logan takes a big step with Miley.
253	4	"A Piece Apart"	Chris Potter	Alexandra Clarke	October 22, 2023	163758-62
Amy must deal with Lyndy's sudden fear of horses. Logan blames himself for Miley's accident and Tim enlists the family to make Shanes return to heartland.
254	5	"How to Say Goodbye"	Michelle Morgan	Heather Conkie	October 29, 2023	163758-63
Amy and Jack train Blue for a competition. Lisa deals with a difficult loss. Lou lets Jessica down in their partnership for the gallery. Katie secretly buys a used dirt bike.
255	6	"Heat of the Moment"	Michelle Morgan	Ken Craw	November 5, 2023	163758-64
Amy faces heartache at the competition, Jack and Lisa embrace adventure, and Katie asserts herself against Ellie and Brandon.
256	7	"Unknown Caller"	Kristin Lehman	Caitlin D. Fryers	November 12, 2023	163758-65
Lou is forced to face the reason for her insomnia. Amy works with a new client and surprisingly she has a connection to Katie. Jack wins over a ranch guest.
257	8	"Harmony"	Kristin Lehman	Mark Haroun and Adam Hussein	November 19, 2023	163758-66
Amy helps a vaulting team ahead of a big competition. Caleb struggles in making decision about Carson while Logan realizes about his future. Lou and Jessica face a stressful gallery opening.
258	9	"Fear is a Liar"	Madison Thomas	Ken Craw	November 26, 2023	163758-67
Amy and Nathan work on retraining his horse. Tim adjusts to new family dynamics when Miranda arrives early to assist with Shane and Chloe's wedding. Jessica must mend a rift with Jack.
259	10	"Just the Beginning"	Dean Bennett	Mark Haroun	December 3, 2023	163758-68
A horse accident endangers Shane's wedding plans. Nathan helps his injured horse and tries reconciling with Amy. Heartland Beef's future grows uncertain. Katie discovers a new part of herself.

=== Season 18 (2024) ===
Episodes were released a week ahead on CBC Gem

No. overall	No. in season	Title	Directed by	Written by	Original release date	Prod. code
260	1	"True Grit"	Dean Bennett	Mark Haroun	October 6, 2024	163758-69
Lou struggles to find ways to promote the ranch's beef business. Amy helps Nathan with his dog Mollie when she gets injured by taking her to a sheepdog competition. There she meets Nathan's ex-wife and learns he was very closed off with her and that was the cause of their divorce. Lou sets up a TV appearance for Jack to promote their beef stew recipe and the Heartland cookbook.
261	2	"Bird's Eye View"	Ken Filewych	Ken Craw	October 13, 2024	163758-70
Katie joins a creative writing group at the library and develops a good relationship with the teacher, Jasmine. Caleb visits and reveals that he is now a transport pilot. Lou works with Nathan on a firebreak - results in lots of tension, as she blames him for taking over Heartlands beef deal.
262	3	"You Can Lead a Horse to Water"	Chris Potter	Caitlin D. Fryers	October 20, 2024	163758-71
Heartland is facing increasing problems with a draught - they even attempt drilling a new well. Lisa is interviewed for a magazine article. Logan is helping with a colt and his urgency to get the colt tamed creates friction between him and Amy. Tim has a few episodes of dizziness and blurry vision and tries to hide it - but Jessica finds out and intends to make him see a doctor. A well is finally struck.
263	4	"Into the Unknown"	Chris Potter	Adam Hussein	October 27, 2024	163758-72
Amy tries to help a horse that needs to be able to play polo. Rumors of Heartland's failing are circulating - Tim and Lou try to stop the talk. Amy and Nathan keep struggling with his reluctance to talk about himself.
264	5	"Fork in the Road"	Michelle Morgan	Ken Craw	November 3, 2024	163758-73
The Hudson rodeo is held and while Caleb looks on Amy and Nathan decide to work together at team roping. Logan is disappointed when he doesn't win his class and that results in him hurting Miley's feelings. At a dance after the rodeo it becomes more clear to Caleb that Nathan and Amy are becoming close. Jack finally agrees to add Bison to his herd.
265	6	"Sisters"	Michelle Morgan	Mika Collins	November 10, 2024	163758-74
Amy, Lou, and Lisa travel to Vancouver to try to get a deal on Bison meat. While there Amy tells Lou about Nathan's father's Alzheimer's, and Lou in turn lets it slip to the buyer who also deals his beef with Nathan. Amy and Lou argue about Amy's loyalty to family in light of the competition between Heartland and Nathan's farm.
266	7	"World on a String"	Melanie Scrofano	Caitlin D. Fryers	November 17, 2024	163758-75
Katie has been keeping her underage a secret from Jasmine because the class is for adults only, and has been going to a bar after class, but not drinking. Lou discovers this secret. Katie tells Lou she wants to live in vancouver with Peter and go to writing school. Nathan tells Amy that he lost their beef contract in Vancouver because the owner learned that Nathan Sr isn't able to run the business. Amy works with a falconer. Tim decides to go to Dallas to explore the chance to become a rodeo commentator.
267	8	"Throwing Your Hat in the Ring"	Melanie Scrofano	Ken Craw	November 24, 2024	163758-76
During a visit from Shane, the Heartland and Pryce beef feud continues. Shane reveals that Chloe is pregnant. With everyone so busy on fighting, Lyndy is ignored so she runs off and is found by Nathan. Meanwhile Katie wants to make things right with Jasmine as Logan has his own horse clinic.
268	9	"Leave No Trace"	Cazhhmere Downey	Caitlin D. Fryers & Mika Collins	December 1, 2024	163758-77
Tim and Jack take Nathan on a fishing trip to try to bond - they agree that they will work together with customers to accept both farm's beef. Lou takes a fall from Stetson after an encounter with a bison. She breaks her leg and is unable to get back to the ranch. Stetson leads Caleb and Amy back to her and she is taken to hospital.
269	10	"Open House"	Dean Bennett	Mark Haroun	December 8, 2024	163758-78
Stetson and Lou are both recovering after Lou's fall. Nathan makes the decision to place his dad into a nursing home. Nathan's sister Gracie comes to town. Caleb confesses the feelings he had toward Amy, but that he has found someone new. Heartland hosts an Open House and demo by Amy - and she surprises Lou by making the demo about repairing the bond between Lou and Stetson. Caleb's "new" friend turns out to be his ex-wife Ashley.

=== Season 19 (2025) ===
No. overall	No. in season	Title	Directed by	Written by	Original release date	Prod. code
270	1	"Risk Everything"	Dean Bennett	Mark Haroun	October 5, 2025	163758-79
A wildfire threatens the ranch, so people and horses get evacuated to Fairfield. Miley has a mare due to foal soon, and it runs back toward the fire. Miley heads back to get her. Amy and Nathan go back to find her and assist and find the mare in labor. Meanwhile Jack and Lisa stay in place despite an evacuation order in an attempt to do all they can to save the ranch. Heartland is saved, but Miley's is destroyed.
271	2	"Two Can Keep a Secret"	Ken Filewych	Caitlin D. Fryers	October 12, 2025	163758-80
Katie tries out for a spot on a cheerleading squad. Lindy shows a heifer in a show, but tells Amy she does not want Nathan to be there after she saw them kissing. When he shows up at the show, Lindy drops out of the show. Nathan struggles over what to do with his father's horse.
272	3	"Ghosts"	Melanie Scrofano	Ken Craw	October 19, 2025	163758-81
Caleb and Ashley invite Nathan and Amy to join them on a trip to a place that Amy had visited with Ty. Nathan had to leave early and Amy tells him that her coolness was because she being reminded of Ty. Caleb offers to fly Nathan back home to see to his father and the airplane's engine fails enroute.
273	4	"Braving the Wilderness"	Melanie Scrofano	Mika Collins	October 26, 2025	163758-82
Caleb is able to land the plane somewhere in the wilderness. Traffic control had their location but it is too dark to rescue them. Amy and Ashley take the horses and finally find them and ride them out.
274	5	"Suspicious Minds"	Cazhhmere Downey	Caitlin D. Fryers	November 2, 2025	163758-83
2 horses at Heartland get sick, and the owner of the client horse, a celebrity, accuses Amy of lack of care. River spends the night with Katie, and they find that he has left home without he mother's knowledge. Lisa learns that her estranged sister has moved and no one knows her current address. Nathan continues to try and win over Lindy. Katie has a story selected for publication.
275	6	"Under the Lights"	Dean Bennett	Ken Craw	November 9, 2025	163758-84
Amy injures her hand practicing team roping with Nathan. Amy suspects Gracie caused the horses to get sick, and she finally tells Nathan. Miley agrees to represent Heartland, and Gracie tries to buy her off to come to their side. Dex takes a job as a rodeo clown and this makes Jack angry - so he fires him.
276	7	"Fall Down, Get Back Up"	Michelle Morgan	Tanvi Bhatia & Mark Haroun	November 16, 2025	163758-85
Dex is homeless and Jack refuses to let him stay in the loft. Jack is starting to have trouble hearing. Amy teaches a friend of Nathan's to ride so he can ride in his wedding.
277	8	"Lost and Found"	Michelle Morgan	Mika Collins and Caitlin D. Fryers	November 23, 2025	163758-86
Lisa has hired a private investigator to find her sister and they meet up. Nathan asks Jack to visit Nathan Sr. While visiting with Lyndy, Jack sneaks Sr's horse into the nursing home. While moving cattle, Amy and Lou discover that a wolf has killed some of the herd and others are missing.
278	9	"Revenge"	Jess Maldaner	Ken Craw	November 30, 2025	163758-87
Georgie does a surprise visit and reveals that she and Quinn broke up. The missing cattle were stolen so Lou installs security cameras to try to catch the smugglers.
279	10	"Forgiveness"	Dean Bennett	Mark Haroun	December 7, 2025	163758-88
Georgie struggles with the notion that Phoenix's career is over - then tells the family that she will be continuing jumping for a stable in Europe. Nathan finds evidence that Gracie was working with the smugglers to steal Heartland horses and shares that with Amy. He then sets a meeting with Gracie, Amy, and Jack where he confronts her and tells her to sell him her half of their farm or she goes to jail and she gives in. Later he tells Amy he has to sell the farm to be able to buy Gracie out and pay Heartland back for the lost cattle. He has a friend with a farm for sale a little bit away and tells Amy that is his plan to move there. He proposes, Amy smiles and the scene ends there without a confirmed answer from Amy.

=== Season 20 (2026) ===
No. overall	No. in season	Title	Directed by	Written by	Original release date	Prod. code
280	1	"Renewal"	Dean Bennett	Mark Haroun	October 4, 2026	163758-89
281	2	"Apples Never Fall"	Ken Filewych	Caitlin D. Fryers	October 11, 2026	163758-90
282	3	"In the Driver's Seat"	Michelle Morgan	Ken Craw	October 18, 2026	163758-91
283	4	"The Glass Floor"	Michelle Morgan	Mika Collins	October 25, 2026	163758-92
284	5	"Once Bitten"	Dean Bennett	Caitlin D. Fryers	November 1, 2026	163758-93
285	6	"The Extra Mile"	Alicia K. Harris	Tanvi Bhatia and Mark Haroun	November 8, 2026	163758-94
286	7	"Steady Grip"	Melanie Scrofano	Ken Craw	November 15, 2026	163758-95
287	8	"A Ride or Die"	Melanie Scrofano	Caitlin D. Fryers and Mika Collins	November 22, 2026	163758-96
288	9	"Long Play"	TBA	TBA	November 29, 2026	TBA
289	10	"Defy the Odds"	TBA	TBA	December 6, 2026	TBA
