= List of Canadian child actors =

This is a list of child actors from Canada. Films and/or television series they appeared in are mentioned only if they were still a child at the time of filming.

Current child actors (under the age of eighteen) are indicated by boldface.

== A ==
- Jessica Amlee (born 1994)
  - Mysterious Ways (1 episode, 2001)
  - The Outer Limits (1 episode, 2001)
  - Dark Angel (1 episode, 2001)
  - Smallville (1 episode, 2001)
  - Miracle Pets (1 episode, 2002)
  - Andromeda (1 episode, 2002)
  - Just Cause (2 episodes, 2002)
  - They (2002)
  - Jeremiah (3 episodes, 2002-2004)
  - My Life Without Me (2003)
  - The Twilight Zone (1 episode, 2003)
  - Stephen King‘s The Dead Zone (2 episodes, 2003-2005)
  - Stargate Atlantis (1 episode, 2004)
  - The Love Crimes of Gillian Guess (2004)
  - Urban Rush (1 episode, 2004)
  - SuperBabies: Baby Geniuses 2 (2004)
  - The Love Crimes of Gillian Guess (2004)
  - Chestnut: Hero of Central Park (2004)
  - Reflection (2004)
  - Absolute Zero (2005)
  - Reflection (2005)
  - Eve and the Fire Horse (2005)
  - Barbie and the Magic of Pegasus 3-D (voice, 2005)
  - Final Destination 3 (2006)
  - The Collector (1 episode, 2006)
  - Absolute Zero (2006)
  - Firestorm: Last Stand at Yellowstone (2006)
  - Last Chance Cafe (2006)
  - The Invisible Dog (short film, 2006)
  - Beneath (2007)
  - Juliana and the Medicine Fish (short film, 2007)
  - Heartland (2007-2013, 2017, 2022)
  - Left Coast (2008)
  - Living Out Loud (2009)
  - A Heartland Christmas (2010)
- Magda Apanowicz (born 1985)
  - Jeremiah (1 episode, 2002)
  - John Doe (1 episode, 2002)
  - Sweet Lullaby (short film, 2003)
- Khiyla Aynne (born 2008)
  - 48 Christmas Wishes (2017)
  - 13: The Musical (2022)

== B ==
- Alexandra Beaton (born 1994)
  - 300 (2006)
- Jessica Barker (born 1977)
  - Le Chemin de Damas (1988)
  - Simon Les Nuages also known as Simon and the Dreamhunters (1990)
  - Une Nuit à L'École (1991)
  - Love Crazy (Amoureux fou) (1991)
  - Le Jardin d'Anna (1992)
  - Les Intrépides also known as The Intrepids (1993)
  - Matusalem (1993)
- Jay Baruchel (born 1982)
  - Are You Afraid of the Dark? (4 episodes, 1995-2000)
  - My Hometown (1996-1998)
  - Popular Mechanics for Kids (1997)
  - The Sickroom (short film, 1998)
  - The Worst Witch (1 episode, 1998)
  - Running Home (1999)
  - Who Gets the House? (1999)
  - Almost Famous (2000)
- Sophie Bennett (born 1989)
  - Critical Choices (1996)
  - Goosebumps (3 episodes, 1996-1998)
  - When Secrets Kill (1997)
  - Real Kids, Real Adventures (1 episode, 1998)
  - The Mighty (1998)
  - Universal Soldier II: Brothers in Arms (1998)
  - What Katy Did (1999)
  - Code Name: Eternity (1 episode, 2000)
  - The Saddle Club (2001-2003)
  - Odyssey 5 (1 episode, 2002)
  - Salem Witch Trials (2002)
  - The Saddle Club: Adventures at Pine Hollow (2002)
  - What Katy Did (2004)
- Daniela Bobadilla (born 1993)
  - Mr. Troop Mom (2009)
  - Smallville (1 episode, 2009)
  - Supernatural (1 episode, 2010)
  - Lie to Me (1 episode, 2010)
  - Lies in Plain Sight (2010)
  - Oliver's Ghost (2011)
- Devon Bostick (born 1991)
  - Exhibit A: Secrets of Forensic Science (1 episode, 1998)
  - Odyssey 5 (2 episodes, 2002-2003)
  - DC 9/11: Time of Crisis (2003)
  - Jake 2.0 (1 episode, 2003)
  - The Truth About the Head (2003)
  - Godsend (2004)
  - 1-800-Missing (1 episode, 2004)
  - Hustle (2004)
  - Knights of the South Bronx (2005)
  - Land of the Dead (2005)
  - King of Sorrow (2006)
  - Aruba (2006)
  - Citizen Duane (2006)
  - American Pie Presents: The Naked Mile (2006)
  - Degrassi: The Next Generation (3 episodes, 2006-2007)
  - Stump (2007)
  - A Life Interrupted (2007)
  - The Altar Boy Gang (2007)
  - The Poet (2007)
  - Fugitive Pieces (2007)
  - The Stone Angel (2007)
  - Finn's Girl (2007)
  - Saw IV (2007)
  - Adoration (2008)
  - The Dreaming (2008)
  - Princess (2008)
  - Roxy Hunter and the Horrific Halloween (2008)
  - The Good Germany (1 episode, 2009)
  - The Border (1 episode, 2009)
  - Guns (2 episodes, 2009)
  - Saw VI (2009)
  - Assassin's Creed: Lineage (short film, 2009)
  - Survival of the Dead (2009)
  - Being Erica (2009-2011)
- Justin Bradley (born 1985)
  - The Little Lulu Show (voice, 26 episodes, 1995-1996)
  - Little Men (1998)
  - Captive (1998)
  - The Country Mouse and the City Mouse Adventures (voice, 23 episodes, 1998-1999)
  - Who Gets the House? (1999)
  - Are You Afraid of the Dark? (1 episode, 1999)
  - Tommy & Oscar (voice, 1999)
  - Lassie (1 episode, 1999)
  - Rotten Ralph (voice, 41 episodes, 1999-2001)
  - Mona the Vampire (voice, 52 episodes, 1999-2002)
  - Waking the Dead (2000)
  - Believe (2000)
  - One Eyed King (2001)
  - Arthur (9 episodes, 2001)
  - Sagwa, the Chinese Siamese Cat (voice, 1 episode, 2002)
  - Galidor: Defenders of the Outer Dimension (1 episode, 2002)
  - Kart Racer (2003)
  - Redeemable in Merchandise (short film, 2003)
  - Mental Block (26 episodes, 2003-2004)
- Stefan Brogren (born 1972)
  - Degrassi Junior High (1987-1989)
  - Degrassi High (1989-1991)
- Genevieve Buechner (born 1991)
  - Saint Monica (2002)
  - Jeremiah (1 episode, 2002)
  - Stephen King's Dead Zone (1 episode, 2003)
  - Devil Winds (2003)
  - Princess Castle (short film, 2003)
  - Family Sins (2004)
  - The Love Crimes of Gillian Guess (2004)
  - The Final Cut (2004)
  - The 4400 (5 episodes, 2004-2005)
  - Bob the Butler (2005)
  - Masters of Horror (1 episode, 2005)
  - Supernatural (1 episode, 2005)
  - Mount Pleasant (2006)
  - Saved (1 episode, 2006)
  - Vipers (2008)
  - Desperate Hours: An Amber Alert (2008)
  - Come Dance at My Wedding (2009)
  - Courage (2009)
  - Jennifer's Body (2009)
  - Caprica (8 episodes, 2009-2010)

== C ==
- Peggy Cartwright (1912–2001)
  - The Birth of a Nation (1915)
  - Intolerance (1916)
  - Billy the Bandit (short film, 1916)
  - A Kentucky Cinderella (1917)
  - The Poor Boob (1919)
  - From Hand to Mouth (short film, 1919)
  - The Third Generation (1920)
  - Love (1920)
  - Mid-Channel (1920)
  - Penrod (1922)
  - One Terrible Day (short film, 1922)
  - Fire Fighters (short film, 1922)
  - Young Sherlocks (short film, 1922)
  - A Quiet Street (short film, 1922)
  - Afraid to Fight (1922)
  - Robin Hood, Jr. (1923)
  - Three Cheers (short film, 1923)
  - Over the Fence (short film, 1923)
  - A Lady of Quality (1924)
  - The Iron Horse (1924)
  - Barnum Junior (short film, 1924)
  - Junior Partner (short film, 1924)
  - Dirty Hands (short film, 1924)
  - Wildcat Willie (short film, 1925)
- Michael Cera (born 1988)
  - Twice in a Lifetime (1 episode, 1999)
  - Noddy (1 episode, 1999)
  - Switching Goals (1999)
  - What Katy Did (1999)
  - I Was a Sixth Grade Alien (22 episodes, 1999-2000)
  - Frequency (2000)
  - Steal This Movie! (2000)
  - Ultimate G's: Zac's Flying Dream (short film, 2000)
  - La Femme Nikita (1 episode, 2000)
  - Anne of Green Gables: The Animated Series (voice, 1 episode)
  - Doc (2 episodes, 2001)
  - The Ripping Friends (voice, 2 episodes, 2001)
  - George Shrinks (1 episode, 2001)
  - I Was a Rat (3 episodes, 2001)
  - Stolen Miracle (2001)
  - My Louisiana Sky (2001)
  - The Familiar Stranger (2001)
  - Walter and Henry (2001)
  - Braceface (voice, 2001-2004)
  - Rolie Polie Olie (voice, 7 episodes, 2001-2004)
  - Rolie Polie Olie: The Great Defender of Fun (voice, 2002)
  - Confessions of a Dangerous Mind (2002)
  - Pecola (voice, 2003)
  - Exit 9 (2003)
  - The Berenstain Bears (voice, 2003-2004)
  - Arrested Development (2003-2006)
  - Wayside (voice, pilot, 2005)
  - Darling, Darling (short film, 2005)
  - Veronica Mars (1 episode, 2006)
  - Tom Goes to the Mayor (1 episode, 2006)
- Hayden Christensen (born 1981)
  - Family Passions (1993)
  - E.N.G. (1 episode, 1993)
  - In the Mouth of Madness (1994)
  - Street Law (1995)
  - Love and Betrayal: The Mia Farrow Story (1995)
  - Harrison Bergeron (1995)
  - No Greater Love (1996)
  - Forever Knight (1 episode, 1996)
  - Goosebumps (1 episode, 1997)
  - All I Wanna Do (1998)
  - The Virgin Suicides (1999)
  - Free Fall (1999)
  - Real Kids, Real Adventures (1 episode, 1999)
  - Are You Afraid of the Dark? (1 episode, 1999)
  - The Famous Jett Jackson (1 episode, 1999)
- Brennan Clost (born 1994)
  - King of the Camp (2007)
  - Degrassi: The Next Generation (1 episode, 2012)
- Alexander Conti (born 1993)
  - Finding Forrester (2000)
  - Braceface (voice, 2001)
  - Street Time (21 episodes, 2002-2003)
  - Missing (1 episode, 2003)
  - When Angels Come to Town (2004)
  - Peep and the Big Wide World (2004)
  - The Grid (1 episode, 2004)
  - Kojak (1 episode, 2005)
  - The Pacifier (2005)
  - Skyland (1 episode, 2006)
  - KAW (2007)
  - Di-Gata Defenders (voice, 26 episodes, 2007-2008)
  - Snow 2: Brain Freeze (2008)
  - The Good Witch's Garden (2009)
  - Overruled! (1 episode, 2009)
  - Harriet the Spy: Blog Wars (2010)
  - Dog Pound (2010)
  - Life with Boys (3 episodes, 2011-2013)
- **Christian Convery** (born 2009)
  - Hearts of Spring (2016)
  - Supernatural (1 episode, 2016)
  - My Christmas Dream (2016)
  - Van Helsing (1 episode, 2016)
  - Christmas List (2016)
  - Legion (3 episodes, 2017)
  - Lucifer (1 episode, 2017)
  - Coming Home for Christmas (2017)
  - Christmas at Holly Lodge (2017)
  - Signed, Sealed, Delivered: The Road Less Traveled (2018)
  - It's Christmas, Eve (2018)
  - A Twist of Christmas (2018)
  - Santa's Boots (2018)
  - Aliens Ate My Homework (2018)
  - The Package (2018)
  - Venom (deleted scene, 2018)
  - Beautiful Boy (2018)
  - A Snake Marked (short film, 2019)
  - Playing with Fire (2019)
  - William (2019)
  - V.C. Andrews' Heaven (2019)
  - Descendants 3 (2019)
  - Pup Academy (2020)
  - Aliens Stole My Body (2020)
  - The Tiger Rising (2021)
  - Diary of a Wimpy Kid (voice, 2021)
  - Sweet Tooth (2021-2024)
  - One Piece (1 episode, 2023)
  - Cocaine Bear (2023)
  - PAW Patrol: The Mighty Movie (voice, 2023)
  - Diary of a Wimpy Kid Christmas: Cabin Fever (voice, 2023)
  - Barron's Cove (2024)
  - The Monkey (2025)
  - Invincible (voice, 7 episodes, 2025)
- Carol Coombs (born 1935)
  - Blossoms in the Dust (1941)
  - The Man Who Returned to Life (1942)
  - On the Sunny Side (1942)
  - The Gay Sisters (1942)
  - The Adventures of Mark Twain (1944)
  - An American Romance (1944)
  - The Very Thought of You (1944)
  - The Clock (1945)
  - Man Alive (1945)
  - Sentimental Journey (1946)
  - It's a Wonderful Life (1946)
  - The Perfect Marriage (1947)
  - Driftwood (1947)
  - The Boy with Green Hair (1948)
  - Knock on Any Door (1949)
  - Mighty Joe Young (1949)
  - Tea for Two (1950)
  - The Mating Season (1951)
  - The Bigelow Theatre (1 episode, 1951)
  - Fireside Theatre (1 episode, 1951)
  - Peter Pan (voice, 1953)
- **Gordon Cormier** (born 2009)
  - Get Shorty (1 episode, 2019)
  - A Christmas Miracle (2019)
  - Christmas Under the Stars (2019)
  - Lost in Space (1 episode, 2019)
  - The Stand (2020-2021)
  - Two Sentence Horror Stories (1 episode, 2021)
  - Turner & Hooch (1 episode, 2021)
  - Gabby Duran & the Unsittables (1 episode, 2021)
  - Team Zenko Go (voice, 13 episodes, 2022)
  - Ready Jet Go! Space Camp (voice, 2023)
  - Avatar: The Last Airbender (2024)

== D ==
- Millie Davis (born 2006)
  - Befriend and Betray (2011)
  - The Magic Hockey Skates (voice, short film, 2012)
  - A Dark Truth (2012)
  - The Doozers (voice, 51 episodes, 2012-2014)
  - The Best Man Holiday (2013)
  - Orphan Black (16 episodes, 2013-2017)
  - Remedy (1 episode, 2014)
  - Annedroids (2014-2017)
  - Odd Squad (2014-2022)
  - Man Seeking Woman (1 episode, 2015)
  - Portal to Hell (short film, 2015)
  - My Viola (short film, 2015)
  - Wishenpoof! (voice, 17 episodes, 2015-2018)
  - Odd Squad: The Movie (2016)
  - Super Why! (voice, 2 episodes, 2016)
  - Playdate (voice, 1 episode, 2016)
  - Wonder (2017)
  - Robot Bullies (short film, 2017)
  - Dino Dana (5 episodes, 2017-2020)
  - Odd Squad: World Turned Odd (2018)
  - Little People (voice, 25 episodes, 2018)
  - Maternal (short film, 2018)
  - Origin (1 episode, 2018)
  - See (1 episode, 2019)
  - Good Boys (2019)
  - Mighty Express (voice, 3 episodes, 2020)
  - Corn & Peg (voice, 2 episodes, 2020)
  - Xavier Riddle and the Secret Museum (voice, 1 episode, 2020)
  - Odd Squad: Mobile Unit (4 episodes, 2020-2021)
  - Lamya's Poem (voice, 2021)
  - Pikwik Pack (voice, 1 episode, 2021)
  - The Parker Andersons/Amelia Parker (2021)
  - Detention Adventure (3 episodes, 2022)
  - CCF's Solstice Stories - Prologue (short film, 2022)
  - Pinkalicious & Peterrific (voice, 1 episode, 2023)
  - Galapagos X (voice, 2023)
  - Shelved (1 episode, 2023)
  - Popularity Papers (2023)
  - The Umbrella Academy (6 episodes, 2024)
- Joe Dinicol (born 1983)
  - Elvis Meets Nixon (1997)
  - Eerie, Indiana: The Other Dimension (1 episode, 1998)
  - Anatole (voice, 1998-1999)
  - The Virgin Suicides (1999)
  - Water Damage (1999)
  - Jacob Two Two Meets the Hooded Fang (1999)
  - Real Kids, Real Adventures (1 episode, 2000)
  - The Loretta Claiborne Story (2000)
  - Mail to the Chief (2000)
  - The Famous Jett Jackson (1 episode, 2000)
  - The Facts of Life Reunion (2001)
- Lucas Donat (born 1962)
  - Damien: Omen II (1978)
- Molly Dunsworth (born 1990)
  - Deeply (2000)
  - The Memory Keeper's Daughter (2008)
  - The Tenth Circle (2008)
  - Treevenge (short film, 2008)

== E ==
- Aryana Engineer (born 2001)
  - Orphan (2009)
  - Resident Evil: Retribution (2012)
  - Dreaming of Peggy Lee (short film, 2015)
- Myles Erlick (born 1998)
  - Flashpoint (2011)
  - Sing Along (short film, 2013)
  - We Are Not Here (short film, 2013)
  - The Next Step (2013–2018)
- Gene Eugene (1961-2000)
  - Nancy (1 episode, 1970)
  - Bewitched (1 episode, 1971)
  - The Sandy Duncan Show (1 episode, 1971)
  - The Amazing Chan and the Chan Clan (voice, 1972)
  - The Screaming Woman (1972)
  - Jigsaw (1972)
  - Gidget Gets Married (1972)
  - Ghost Story (1 episode, 1972)
  - Cannon (1 episode, 1972)
  - The ABC Saturday Superstar Movie (voice, 1972)
  - The Barkleys (voice, 1972)
  - The Bold Ones: The New Doctors (1 episode, 1972)
  - Hec Remsey (1 episode, 1973)

== F ==
- Jodelle Ferland (born 1994)
  - Cold Squad (2 episodes, 1999)
  - Higher Ground (1 episode, 2000)
  - Mermaid (2000)
  - The Linda McCartney Story (2000)
  - Special Delivery (2000)
  - Wolf Lake (1 episode, 2001)
  - Dark Angel (1 episode, 2001)
  - The Lone Gunmen (1 episode, 2001)
  - Trapped (2001)
  - Deadly Little Secrets (2001)
  - The Miracle of the Cards (2001)
  - So Weird (1 episode, 2001)
  - Special Unit 2 (1 episode, 2002)
  - John Doe (pilot episode, 2002)
  - Carrie (2002)
  - They (2002)
  - Mob Princess (2003)
  - Kingdom Hospital (2004)
  - The Collector (1 episode, 2004)
  - 10.5 (2004)
  - Too Cool for Christmas (2004)
  - Tideland (2005)
  - Silent Hill (2006)
  - Amber's Story (2006)
  - Supernatural (1 episode, 2006)
  - Stargate SG-1 (1 episode, 2006)
  - Masters of Horror: The V Word (2006)
  - The Secret of Hidden Lake (2006)
  - Pictures of Hollis Woods (2007)
  - Stargate Atlantis (1 episode, 2007)
  - The Messengers (2007)
  - Seed (2007)
  - Good Luck Chuck (2007)
  - BloodRayne 2: Deliverance (2007)
  - Céline (2008)
  - Wonderful World (2009)
  - Case 39 (2009)
  - Ice Quake (2010)
  - The Twilight Saga: Eclipse (2010)
  - Girl Fight (2011)
  - The Haunting Hour: The Series (2 episodes, 2011-2012)
  - Home Alone: The Holiday Heist (2012)
  - Mighty Fine (2012)
  - The Cabin in the Woods (2012)
  - ParaNorman (voice, 2012)
  - The Tall Man (2012)
- Alex Ferris (born 1997)
  - The Five People You Meet in Heaven (2004)
  - Stargate SG-1 (1 episode, 2005)
  - Terminal City (5 episodes, 2005)
  - The L Word (7 episodes, 2005-2007)
  - Firehouse Tales (15 episodes, 2005-2006)
  - RV (2006)
  - X-Men: The Last Stand (2006)
  - Memory (2006)
  - Supernatural (1 episode, 2006)
  - Fallen (2006)
  - Masters of Horror (1 episode, 2006)
  - Passion's Web (2007)
  - JPod (2 episodes, 2007)
  - The Invisible (2007)
  - Peanuts Motion Comics (voice, 2008)
  - Martha Speaks (30 episodes, 2008-2013)
  - Smallville (1 episode, 2009)
  - Living Out Loud (2009)
  - Dinosaur Train (1 episode, 2009)
  - Harper's Island (1 episode, 2009)
  - The Time Traveler's Wife (2009)
  - Battlestar Galactica: The Plan (2009)
  - Tooth Fairy (2010)
  - Barbie in A Mermaid Tale (voice, 2010)
  - Diary of a Wimpy Kid (2010)
  - Daydream Nation (2010)
  - Eureka (2 episodes, 2010-2011)
  - Hunt for the I-5 Killer (2011)
  - Sanctuary (1 episode, 2011)
  - Superbook (voice, 1 episode, 2012)
  - A Killer Among Us (2012)
  - In Their Skin (2012)
  - A Wife's Nightmare (2014)
  - Cedar Cove (1 episode, 2015)
  - Signed, Sealed, Delivered: Truth Be Told (2015)
- Carrie Finlay (born 1986)
  - Mona the Vampire (voice, 1999-2003)
  - The Kids from Room 402 (voice, 24 episodes, 2000-2001)
  - Momo (English voice of Momo, 2001)
  - X-DuckX (voice in the English dub, 2001-2005)
  - Sagwa, the Chinese Siamese Cat (voice, 1 episode, 2002)
  - Marsupilami (voice in the English dub, 2003)
  - Potatoes and Dragons (English voice of Melodine, 2004)
  - The Boy (voice, 2004-2005)
- Leo, Gerry and Myles Fitzgerald (born 1993)
  - Baby Geniuses (1999)
  - Superbabies: Baby Geniuses 2 (2004)
- Michael J. Fox (born 1961)
  - Leo and Me (1977-1978)
  - The Magic Lie (1 episode, 1978)
  - Witch of Westminster Crossing (short film, 1978)
  - Letters from Frank (1979)
  - Lou Grant (1979)

== G ==
- Alasdair Gillis (born 1971)
  - You Can't Do That on Television (1982–1986)
- Ryan Gosling (born 1980)
  - Mickey Mouse Club (1993–1995)
  - Young Hercules (1998-1999)
- Dakota Goyo (born 1999)
  - Ultra Brett (2006)
  - Resurrecting the Champ (2007)
  - Emotional Arithmetic (2007)
  - Solving Charlie (2009)
  - Defendor (2009)
  - Arthur (2010–2012)
  - Thor (2011)
  - Real Steel (2011)
  - Rise of the Guardians (2012)
  - Dark Skies (2013)
  - The Journey Home (2014)
  - Dark Skies (2014)

== H ==
- Corey Haim (1971–2010)
  - Lucas (1986)
  - The Lost Boys (1987)
- Emma Hentchel (born 2002)
  - Open Heart (2015)
  - Mommy's Little Girl (2016)
- Neil Hope (1972–2007)
  - Kids of Degrassi Street (1985–1987)
  - Degrassi Junior High (1987–1989)
  - Degrassi High (1989–1991)
- Tyler Hynes (born 1986)
  - Home Team (1998)
  - Betty & Coretta (2013)

== J ==
- Devery Jacobs (born 1993)
  - The Dead Zone (1 episode, 2007)
  - South of the Moon (2008)
  - Assassin's Creed: Lineage (2009)
- Lisa Jakub (born 1978)
  - Eleni (1985)
  - Mrs. Doubtfire (1993)
  - Matinee (1993)
  - A Child's Cry for Help (1994)
  - Picture Perfect (1995)
  - The Beautician and the Beast (1997)
  - Painted Angels (1998)
- Avan Jogia (born 1992)
  - A Girl Like Me: The Gwen Araujo Story (2006)
  - The Diary (2007)
  - Aliens in America (recurring role; 3 episodes, 2007)
  - Gym Teacher: The Movie (2008)
  - Spectacular! (2008)
  - Caprica (2008)
  - Spectacular! (2009)
  - Caprica (recurring role; 3 episodes, 2009-2010)
  - Victorious (2009-2013)
- Jamie Johnston (born 1989)
  - I Was A Sixth Grade Alien (1999-2000)
  - Jackie, Ethel, Joan: The Women of Camelot (2001)
  - Winter Sun (short film, 2002)
  - Doc (1 episode, 2002)
  - Ace Lightning (2002-2004)
  - Name of the Rose (2003)
  - Absolon (2003)
  - More Than Meets the Eye: The Joan Brock Story (2003)
  - Killer Instinct: From the Files of Agent Candice DeLong (2003)
  - Public Domain (2003)
  - Wild Card (2003-2005)
  - Zixx: Level One (2004)
  - Zixx: Level Two (2005)
  - The Rick Mercer Report (1 episode, 2005)
  - Degrassi: The Next Generation (2005-2010)
- Alessandro Juliani (born 1975)
  - Captain N: The Game Master (1989–1991)

== K ==
- Kiawentiio (born 2006)
  - Anne with an E (5 episodes, 2019)
  - Beans (2020)
  - Rutherford Falls (2 episodes, 2021)
  - N'xaxaitkw (short film, 2022)
  - What If...? (1 episode, 2023)
  - Avatar: The Last Airbender (2024)
- Dylan Kingwell (born 2004)
  - A Series of Unfortunate Events (2017-19)
- Matthew Knight (born 1994)
  - Queer as Folk (1 episode, 2000)
  - Big Spender (2003)
  - 1-800-Missing (1 episode, 2003)
  - Peep (short film, 2004)
  - Peep and the Big Wide World (voice, 1 episode, 2005)
  - Kojak (2 episodes, 2005)
  - The Greatest Game Ever Played (2005)
  - Cheaper by the Dozen 2 (2005)
  - The Grudge 2 (2006)
  - Skyland (1 episode, 2006)
  - For the Love of a Child (2006)
  - Candles on Bay Street (2006)
  - Intimate Stranger (2006)
  - Skinwalkers (2006)
  - Christmas in Wonderland (2007)
  - All the Good Ones Are Married (2007)
  - The Dresden Files (2 episodes, 2007-2008)
  - Finn on the Fly (2008)
  - The Good Witch (2008)
  - The Good Witch's Garden (2009)
  - Gooby (2009)
  - The Grudge 3 (2009)
  - Cartoon Gene (2009)
  - Flashpoint (1 episode, 2010)
  - A Heartland Christmas (2010)
  - The Good Witch's Gift (2010)
  - My Babysitter's a Vampire (2010)
  - R.L. Stine's The Haunting Hour (1 episode, 2011)
  - The Good Witch's Family (2011)
  - My Babysitter's a Vampire (2011-2012)
  - The Good Witch's Charm (2012)
- Hattie Kragten (born 2007)
  - Incorporated (4 episodes, 2016-2017)
  - Christmas Wedding Planner (2017)
  - Christmas in Angel Falls (2017)
  - Magical Christmas Ornaments (2017)
  - Murdoch Mysteries (1 episode, 2017)
  - Christmas at Grand Valley (2018)
  - Backstabbing for Beginners (2018)
  - Esme & Roy (voice, 2018-2021)
  - PJ Masks (voice, since 2019)
  - Abby Hatcher (voice, 2019-2020)
  - Corn & Peg (voice, 2019-2020)
  - Odd Squad (1 episode, 2019)
  - Frankie Drake Mysteries (1 episode, 2019)
  - Xavier Riddle and the Secret Museum (voice, 1 episode, 2019)
  - Spinning Out (1 episode, 2020)
  - Odd Squad (9 episodes, 2020)
  - The Solutioneers (2020)
  - The Santa Squad (2020)
  - The Snoopy Show (voice, 2021-2023)
  - Go, Dog. Go! (voice, 4 episodes, 2021-2023)
  - Daddy's Perfect Little Girl (2021)
  - Who Are You, Charlie Brown? (voice, 2021)
  - Snoopy Presents: For Auld Lang Syne (voice, 2021)
  - Snoopy Presents: It's The Small Things, Charlie Brown (voice, 2022)
  - Snoopy Presents: To Mom (and Dad), With Love (voice, 2022)
  - Snoopy Presents: Lucy's School (voice, 2022)
  - Snoopy Presents: Welcome Home, Franklin (voice, 2024)
  - The Next Step (2024)
  - Snoopy Presents: A Summer Musical (voice, 2025)
- Isaac Kragten (born 2002)
  - Rookie Blue (1 episode, 2015)
  - Odd Squad (main role, 2016-2019)
  - OddTube (2016-2017)
  - Odd Squad: The Movie (2016)
  - Total Frat Movie (2016)
  - Odd Squad: World Turned Odd (2018)
  - Taken (1 episode, 2018)
  - Breakthrough (2019)
  - The War with Grandpa (2020)
  - The Kid Detective (2020)

== L ==
- Antoine L'Écuyer (born 1997)
  - Les Boys (1 episode, 2007)
  - It's Not Me, I Swear! (2008)
  - Pour toujours, les Canadiens! (2009)
  - Astro Boy (voice over for the film's French edition, 2009)
  - Les Rescapés (2010-2012)
  - The Four Soldiers (2013)
  - La Garde (2014)
  - 2 temps, 3 mouvements (2014)
  - Corbo (2014)
  - Chorus (2015)
  - The Sound of Trees (2015)
  - Jérémie (2015-2017)
- Gabriel LaBelle (born 2002)
  - Motive (1 episode, 2013)
  - iZombie (1 episode, 2015)
  - Max 2: White House Hero (2017)
  - Dead Shack (2017)
  - The Predator (2018)
- Sarah-Jeanne Labrosse (born 1991)
  - Le Volcan Tranquille (1997)
  - Summer with the Ghosts (2003)
  - 15/Love (4 episodes, 2004-2006)
  - Aurore (2005)
  - Human Trafficking (2005)
  - Bon Cop, Bad Cop (2006)
  - Eastern Promises (2007)
  - Nos étés (4 episodes, 2007)
  - The Trotsky (2009)
- Charlotte Laurier (born 1966)
  - Good Riddance (1980)
  - Une aurore boréale (1981)
  - Piwi (short film, 1981)
  - S.O.S. j'écoute (1982)
  - La vie promise (1983)
  - The Tin Flute (1983)
  - Starbreaker (short film, 1984)
- **Alix West Lefler** (born 2011)
  - Riverdale (2021–2022)
  - The Good Nurse (2022)
  - The King Tide (2023)
  - My Life with the Walter Boys (2023–present)
  - Fire Country (2024)
  - Speak No Evil (2024)
- Vanessa Lengies (born 1985)
  - Arthur (voice, 29 episodes, 1996-2006)
  - Lassie (1 episode, 1997)
  - Radio Active (1998)
  - The Tale of the Great Bunny (1998)
  - The Country Mouse and the City Mouse Adventures (voice, 23 episodes, 1998-1999)
  - The Little Lulu Show (voice, 26 episodes, 1998-1999)
  - Are You Afraid of the Dark? (26 episodes, 1999-2000)
  - Caillou (voice, 3 episodes, 2000)
  - Ratz (2000)
  - For Better or For Worse (voice, 5 episodes, 2000-2001)
  - American Dreams (2002-2005)
  - Pet Star (4 episodes, 2003-2005)
- Hannah Lochner (born 1993)
  - Exhibit A: Secrets of Forensic Science (1 episode, 1997)
  - Traders (1 episode, 1998)
  - Real Kids, Real Adventures (1 episode, 1999)
  - Must Be Santa (1999)
  - La Femme Nikita (1 episode, 1999)
  - Angels in the Infield (2000)
  - Hold-Up (short film, 2000)
  - Sanctuary (2001)
  - Doc (1 episode, 2002)
  - Torso: The Evelyn Dick Story (2002)
  - Salem Witch Trials (2002)
  - Body & Soul (1 episode, 2002)
  - The Interrogation of Michael Crowe (2002)
  - Terminal Invasion (2002)
  - The Pentagon Papers (2003)
  - Encrypt (2003)
  - Wild Card (pilot episode, 2003)
  - The Elizabeth Smart Story (2003)
  - Behind the Red Door (2003)
  - Dawn of the Dead (2004)
  - Child of Mine (2005)
  - G-Spot (13 episodes, 2005-2006)
  - In God's Country (2007)
  - Firehouse Dog (2007)
  - The Gathering (2007)
  - Life with Derek (3 episodes, 2007-2008)
  - The Devil's Mercy (2008)
  - Jack and Jill vs. the World (2008)
  - Harm's Way (2008)
  - The Latest Buzz (3 episodes, 2008-2009)
  - Wingin' It (2010-2013)
- Quinn Lord (born 1999)
  - ToddWorld (voice, 1 episode, 2004)
  - Advertisements for Kohl's, London Drugs and Capital One (2004-2005)
  - Terminal City (1 episode, 2005)
  - Reunion (1 episode, 2005)
  - The L Word (1 episode, 2006)
  - Blade: The Series (1 episode, 2006)
  - Stargate SG-1 (1 episode, 2006)
  - Supernatural (1 episode, 2006)
  - Deck the Halls (2006)
  - White Noise: The Light (2007)
  - Trick 'r Treat (2007)
  - Things We Lost in the Fire (2007)
  - Masters of Horror (1 episode, 2007)
  - Smallville (2 episodes, 2007)
  - Sabbatical (2007)
  - 3-2-1 Penguins! (voice, 20 episodes, 2007-2008)
  - The Virgin of Akron, Ohio (1 episode, 2007)
  - Edison and Leo (2008)
  - Web of Desire (2008)
  - ToddWorld (voice, 1 episode, 2008)
  - Peanuts Motion Comics (voice, 2008)
  - Space Buddies (2009)
  - The Imaginarium of Doctor Parnassus (2009)
  - Santa Buddies (2009)
  - Virtuality (2009)
  - The Hole (2009)
  - Second Chances (2010)
  - Call Me Mrs. Miracle (2010)
  - Daydream Nation (2010)
  - Fringe (1 episode, 2010)
  - Hiccups (1 episode, 2010)
  - Shattered (1 episode, 2010)
  - Eureka (1 episode, 2011)
  - Endgame (1 episode, 2011)
  - Captain Starship (2011)
  - Last Christmas (short film, 2011)
  - Afternoon Tea (short film, 2011)
  - 17th Precinct (2011)
  - R.L. Stine's The Haunting Hour (2 episodes, 2011-2012)
  - Once Upon a Time (1 episode, 2012)
  - The Possession (2012)
  - Imaginaerum (2012)
  - In Their Skin (2012)
  - Virtual Lies (2012)
  - Arctic Air (1 episode, 2013)
  - Floodplain (short film, 2013)
  - The 100 (1 episode, 2014)
  - Date and Switch (2014)
  - The Man in the High Castle (21 episodes, 2015-2019)
  - Date with Love (2016)
- Jessica Lucas (born 1985)
  - Seven Days (1 episode, 2000)
  - Halloweentown II: Kalabar's Revenge (2001)
  - The Sausage Factory (1 episode, 2001)
  - Edgemont (40 episodes, 2001-2005)
  - Damaged Care (2002)
  - 2030 CE (2002-2003)
  - Romeo! (1 episode, 2003)
- Alexander Ludwig (born 1992)
  - Air Bud: World Pup (2000)
  - MXP: Most Xtreme Primate (2004)
  - Scary Godmother: The Revenge of Jimmy (voice, 2005)
  - Eve and the Fire Horse (2005)
  - A Little Thing Called Murder (2006)
  - The Sandlot: Heading Home (2007)
  - The Seeker: The Dark Is Rising (2007)
  - Race to Witch Mountain (2009)
- Erica Luttrell (born 1982)
  - Shining Time Station (44 episodes, 1991–1993)
  - Schemer Presents! (2 episodes, 1993)
  - Bookmice (voice, 12 episodes, 1993-1995)
  - The Magic School Bus (voice, 1994-1997)
  - Shining Time Station: Once Upon a Time (1995)
  - Shining Time Station: Second Chances (1995)
  - Shining Time Station: One of the Family (1995)
  - Shining Time Station: Queen for a Day (1995)
  - Hangin' with Mr. Cooper (1 episode, 1995)
  - The Adventures of Dudley the Dragon (1 episode, 1995)
  - Goosebumps (2 episodes, 1995-1996)
  - The New Ghostwriter Mysteries (1997)
  - Honey, We Shrunk Ourselves (1997)
  - General Hospital (1 episode, 1998)
  - Dear America: A Picture of Freedom (1999)
  - Dangerous Evidence: The Lori Jackson Story (1999)
  - The Jersey (1 episode, 1999)
  - The Famous Jett Jackson (1 episode, 1999)
  - Buffy the Vampire Slayer (1 episode, 2000)

== M ==
- Laine MacNeil (born 1996)
  - Mr. Troop Mom (2009)
  - Diary of a Wimpy Kid (2010)
  - Diary of a Wimpy Kid: Rodrick Rules (2011)
  - Shattered (1 episode, 2011)
  - The Haunting Hour: The Series (2 episodes, 2011-2013)
  - The Pregnancy Project (2012)
  - Falling Skies (1 episode, 2012)
  - Diary of a Wimpy Kid: Dog Days (2012)
  - Horns (2013)
  - The Killing (2 episodes, 2013)
  - Almost Human (1 episode, 2014)
  - Motive (1 episode, 2014)
  - The Unauthorized Saved by the Bell Story (2014)
  - Damaged (2014)
  - Strange Empire (1 episode, 2014)
- Keenan MacWilliam (born 1989)
  - Deep in My Heart (1999)
  - The Bone Collector (1999)
  - Must Be Santa (1999)
  - Are You Afraid of the Dark? (1 episode, 2000)
  - The Best Girl (short film, 2000)
  - The Saddle Club (2001–2003)
  - The Saddle Club: Adventures at Pine Hollow (2002)
  - Get a Clue (2002)
  - Soul Food (3 episodes, 2004)
- Kiana Madeira (born 1992)
  - Little Mosque on the Prairie (1 episode, 2007)
  - Harriet the Spy: Blog Wars (2010)
- Ari Magder (1983–2012)
  - Shining Time Station (44 episodes, 1991–1993)
- Chris Makepeace (born 1964)
  - The Ottawa Valley (1974)
  - Meatballs (1979)
  - Other People's Children (1980)
  - My Bodyguard (1980)
  - The Littlest Hobo (1 episode, 1981)
  - The Last Chase (1981)
  - Going Great (1982)
  - The Mysterious Stranger (1982)
  - Mazes and Monsters (1982)
- Danielle Marcot (born 1983)
  - Shining Time Station (1991–1995)
- Pat Mastroianni (born 1971)
  - Degrassi Junior High (1987–1989)
  - Degrassi High (1989-1991)
- Rachel McAdams (born 1978)
  - Shotgun Love Dolls (pilot, 2001)
  - The Famous Jett Jackson (1 episode, 2001)
  - Earth: Final Conflict (1 episode, 2002)
  - Guilt by Association (2002)
  - My Name is Tanino (2002)
  - Perfect Pie (2002)
  - The Hot Chick (2002)
  - Slings & Arrows (7 episodes, 2003-2005)
  - The Notebook (2004)
  - Mean Girls (2004)
  - Wedding Crashers (2005)
  - The Family Stone (2005)
  - Red Eye (2005)
- Emilia McCarthy (born 1997)
  - Booky and the Secret Santa (2007)
  - Booky's Crush (2009)
  - Beauty and the Beast (1 episode, 2012)
  - Bunks (2013)
  - Wild Kratts (1 episode, 2013)
  - Kid's Town (3 episodes, 2013)
  - Unlikely Heroes (8 episodes, 2013)
  - Hemlock Grove (9 episodes, 2013)
  - Max & Shred (2013-2016)
  - Maps to the Stars (2014)
  - Zapped (2014)
  - Wild Kratts: A Creature Christmas (2015)
- Miriam McDonald (born 1987)
  - System Crash (1999)
  - Degrassi: The Next Generation (2001–2010)
  - Pecola (voice, 2001-2003)
  - Blue Murder (1 episode, 2004)
  - She's Too Young (2004)
  - Karma (2005)
- Christine McGlade (born 1963)
  - You Can't Do That on Television (1979–1986)
- Jane McGregor (born 1983)
  - The Odyssey (1994)
  - So Weird (1999)
  - Live Through This (2000)
- Britt McKillip (born 1991)
  - Baby Looney Tunes (2002–2005)
  - Sabrina's Secret Life (2003–2004)
  - Dead Like Me (2003–2004)
- Sammy McKim (1924-2004)
  - Annie Oakley (1935)
  - San Francisco (1936)
  - It Happened in Hollywood (1937)
  - The Crowd Roars (1938)
  - Mr. Smith Goes to Washington (1939)
  - Little Men (1940)
  - Men of Boys Town (1941)
  - Wild Bill Hickok Rides (1942)
- Heather Menzies (1949–2017)
  - The Sound of Music (1965)
  - Hawaii (1966)
- Atticus Mitchell (born 1993)
  - How to Be Indie (3 episodes, 2009)
  - Living in Your Car (1 episode, 2010)
  - My Babysitter's a Vampire (2010)
  - My Babysitter's a Vampire (2011-2012)
- Lee Montgomery (born 1961)
  - The Million Dollar Duck (1971)
  - Ben (1972)
  - Runaway! (1973)
  - Columbo: Mind Over Mayhem (1974)
  - Burnt Offerings (1976)
  - Baker's Hawk (1976)
  - Dead of Night (1977)
  - True Grit: A Further Adventure (1978)
- Vanessa Morgan (born 1992)
  - A Diva's Christmas Carol (2000)
  - The Latest Buzz (2007-2010)
  - Harriet the Spy: Blog Wars (2010)
  - Frankie & Alice (2010)
  - My Babysitter's a Vampire (2010)
- Wesley Morgan (born 1990)
  - Overruled! (2007)
  - Paradise Falls (26 episodes, 2008)
  - The Rocker (2008)
- Alanis Morissette (born 1974)
  - You Can't Do That on Television (5 episodes, 1986-1987)
- Gig Morton (born 1996)
  - Air Buddies (2006)
  - Psych (1 episode, 2007)
  - Snow Buddies (2008)
  - The Escape of Conrad Lard-Bottom (short film, 2008)
  - Christmas Town (2008)
  - Past Lies (2008)
  - Fear Itself (1 episode, 2008)
  - Space Buddies (2009)
  - Santa Buddies (2009)
  - Mistresses (2009)
  - Impact (2009)
  - Angel and the Bad Man (2009)
  - Shattered (1 episode, 2010)
  - Elopement (2010)
  - Jesus Chris (short film, 2011)
  - Mr. Young (2011-2013)
  - My Mother's Future Husband (2014)
- Mike Myers (born 1963)
  - King of Kensington (1 episode, 1975)
  - Range Ryder and the Calgary Kid (1977)
  - The Littlest Hobo (1 episode, 1979)
  - Bizarre (1980)

== N ==
- Briar Nolet (born 1998)
  - The Next Step (2014–2022)
  - An American Girl: Isabelle Dances Into the Spotlight (2014)
  - The Captain Calamity Adventures (2015)
  - Blood Hunters (2016)

== O ==
- Chloe O'Malley (born 2001)
  - Northpole (2014)
  - The Strain (2 episodes, 2014)

== P ==
- Elliot Page (born 1987)
  - Pit Pony (1997)
  - Pit Pony (1999-2000)
  - Trailer Park Boys (5 episodes, 2002)
  - Rideau Hall (1 episode, 2002)
  - The Wet Season (short film, 2002)
  - Marion Bridge (2002)
  - Touch & Go (2002)
  - Love That Boy (2003)
  - Homeless to Harvard: The Liz Murray Story (2003)
  - Going For Broke (2003)
  - Ghost Cat (2004)
  - I Downloaded a Ghost (2004)
  - ReGenesis (8 episodes, 2004)
  - Wilby Wonderful (2004)
  - Hard Candy (2005)
  - Mouth to Mouth (2005)
- Aislinn Paul (born 1994)
  - The Famous Jett Jackson (1 episode, 2000)
  - Doc (2 episodes, 2001)
  - In a Heartbeat (2 episodes, 2001)
  - Sister Mary Explains It All (2001)
  - Do or Die (2003)
  - Betrayed (2003)
  - Wild Card (2003-2005)
  - Zoé Kézako (voice, 3 episodes, 2004)
  - Murder in the Hamptons (2005)
  - Candles on Bay Street (2006)
  - Degrassi: The Next Generation (2006-2015)
  - Tell Me You Love Me (2007)
  - Degrassi: Minis (2008-2015)
  - Finn on the Fly (2008)
  - Harriet the Spy: Blog Wars (2010)
  - Trigger (2010)
  - Degrassi Takes Manhattan (2010)
- Jack Pickford (1896–1933)
  - The Kid (1910)
  - The Newlyweds (1910)
  - The Smoker (1910)
  - The Modern Prodigal (1910)
  - Muggsy Becomes a Hero (1910)
  - In Life's Cycle (1910)
  - The Oath and the Man (1910)
  - Examination Day at School (1910)
  - The Iconoclast (1910)
  - Two Little Waifs (1910)
  - A Plainsong (1910)
  - A Child's Stratagem (1910)
  - The Lesson (1910)
  - His Trust Fulfilled (1911)
  - The Poor Sick Men (1911)
  - White Roses (1911)
  - A Decree of Destiny (1911)
  - The Stuff Heroes are Made Of (1911)
  - The Massacre (1912)
  - Kate Katchem (1912)
  - A Dash Through the Clouds (1912)
  - The School Teacher and the Waif (1912)
  - An Indian Summer (1912)
  - What the Doctor Ordered (1912)
  - A Child's Remorse (1912)
  - The Inner Circle (1912)
  - Mr. Grouch at the Seashore (1912)
  - A Pueblo Legend (1912)
  - A Feud in the Kentucky Hills (1912)
  - The Painted Lady (1912)
  - The Musketeers of Pig Alley (1912)
  - Heredity (1912)
  - My Baby (1912)
  - The Informer (1912)
  - Brutality (1912)
  - The New York Hat (1912)
  - My Hero (1912)
  - A Misappropriated Turkey (1913)
  - Love in an Apartment Hotel (1913)
  - The Unwelcome Guest (1913)
  - The Gangsters of New York (1914)
  - Home, Sweet Home (1914)
  - His Last Dollar (1914)
  - Wildflower (1914)
- Sarah Polley (born 1979)
  - The Adventures of Baron Munchausen (1988)
  - Road to Avonlea (1990–1994)
  - Johann's Gift to Christmas (tv short, 1991)
  - The Hidden Room (1993)
  - Take Another Look (1994)
  - Straight Up (1996)
- Connor Price (born 1994)
  - Sins of the Father (2002)
  - The Save-Ums! (2003)
  - Cinderella Man (2005)
  - The Dead Zone (2007)
  - Good Luck Chuck (2007)
  - Roxy Hunter and the Horrific Halloween (2008)
  - Ollie & the Baked Halibut (short film, 2009)
  - Summer Camp (2010)
  - What's Up Warthogs! (2011-2012)
  - Frenemies (2012)

== R ==
- Adam Reid (born 1973)
  - You Can't Do That on Television (1984–1987)
- Lisa Ruddy (born 1967)
  - You Can't Do That on Television (1979–1985)
- John Paul Ruttan (born 2001)
  - Rick Mercer Report (1 episode, 2008)
  - Murdoch Mysteries (1 episode, 2009)
  - Degrassi: The Next Generation (1 episode, 2010)
  - I'll Follow You Down (2012)
  - RoboCop (2014)
  - Against the Wild 2: Survive the Serengeti (2015)
- Colleen Rennison (born 1987)
  - Carpool (1996)
  - The Story of Us (1999)

== S ==
- Klea Scott (born 1968)
  - You Can't Do That on Television (1982–1984)
- Noah Ryan Scott (born 2000)
  - The Rick Mercer Report (2006-2013)
  - Booky and the Secret Santa (2007)
  - Little Mosque on the Prairie (1 episode, 2008)
  - Booky's Crush (2009)
  - The Girl Who Cried Pearls (2010)
  - Moon Point (2011)
  - Sunshine Sketches of a Little Town (2012)
  - Kid's Town (2013)
- Siluck Saysanasy (born 1974)
  - Degrassi Junior High (1987)
  - Degrassi High (1987–1991)
- Melinda Shankar (born 1992)
  - Degrassi: The Next Generation (2008-2015)
  - Degrassi Goes Hollywood (2009)
  - Degrassi in India (2010)
  - Degrassi Takes Manhattan (2010)
  - Trigger (2010)
  - Harriet the Spy: Blog Wars (2010)
  - Festival of Lights (2010)
- Lydia Shum (1945-2008)
  - Yi shu tao hua qian duo hong (1960)
  - Mang mu de ai qing (1961)
  - Huo ku you lan (1961)
  - Hong lou meng (1962)
  - Xi shi zhong zhong (1962)
  - Feng huan chao (1963)
  - Yang Nai Wu yu Xiao Bai Cai (1963)
- Gregory Smith (born 1983)
  - Small Soldiers (1998)
  - Harriet the Spy (1999)
  - the Patriot (2000)
- Amanda Stepto (born 1970)
  - Degrassi Junior High (1987-1989)
- Cassie Steele (born 1989)
  - Relic Hunter (1 episode, 2001)
  - Degrassi: The Next Generation (2001-2010)
  - Doc (1 episode, 2004)
  - Full-Court Miracle (2004)
  - The Best Years (3 episodes, 2007)
  - 'Da Kink in My Hair (1 episode, 2007)
  - Super Sweet 16: The Movie (2007)
- Tara Strong (born 1973)
  - Sylvanian Families (voice, 1 episode, 1987)
  - Hello Kitty's Furry Tale Theater (voice, 5 episodes, 1987)
  - Maxie's World (voice, 1987)
  - My Pet Monster (voice, 1987)
  - The Care Bears Family (voice, 27 episodes, 1988)
  - Garbage Pail Kids (voice, 1988)
  - Clifford the Big Red Dog (voice, 1988)
  - Madeline (voice, 1988)
  - The Wild Puffalumps (voice, short film, 1988)
  - Care Bears Nutcracker Suite (voice, 1988)
  - T. and T. (1 episode, 1988)
  - Mosquito Lake (1989)
  - The Long Road Home (1989)
  - Babar (voice, 26 episodes, 1989)
  - Beetlejuice (voice, 32 episodes, 1989-1991)
  - Piggsburg Pigs! (voice, 1 episode, 1990)
  - The Adventures of Super Mario Bros. 3 (voice, 1990)
  - The Campbells (1 episode, 1990)
  - Bill & Ted's Excellent Adventures (voice, 3 episodes, 1991)
  - ProStars (voice, 1991)
  - Wish Kid (voice, 1991)
  - Here's How! (voice, 1991)
  - The Raccoons (voice, 1 episode, 1991)
  - Super Mario World (voice, 1991)
  - Married to It (1991)
  - Street Legal (1 episode, 1991)
  - Little Shop (voice, 1991)
  - Only Yesterday (English voice of Naoko, 1991)

== T ==
- Momona Tamada (born 2006)
  - The Boys (1 episode, 2019)
  - The Terror (1 episode, 2019)
  - To All the Boys: P.S. I Still Love You (2020)
  - The Main Event (2020)
  - Gabby Duran & the Unsittables (1 episode, 2020)
  - A Babysitter's Guide to Monster Hunting (2020)
  - The Baby-Sitters Club (2020-2021)
  - To All the Boys: Always and Forever (2021)
  - Secret Headquarters (2022)
  - Super PupZ (2022)
  - Oni: Thunder God's Tale (voice, 2022)
  - Avatar: The Last Airbender (2024)
  - The Spiderwick Chronicles (2024-present)
- Emma Taylor-Isherwood (born 1987)
  - Mona the Vampire (1999–2003)
  - Strange Days at Blake Holsey High (2002–2006)
- Sally Taylor-Isherwood (born 1991)
  - Arthur (2004–2022)
- Emily Tennant (born 1990)
  - Scooby-Doo 2: Monsters Unleashed (2004)
  - I, Robot (2004)
  - The Sisterhood of the Traveling Pants (2005)
  - Dr. Dolittle 3 (2006)
  - Juno (2007)
- Christian Tessier (born 1978)
  - You Can't Do That On Television (1989–1990)
  - The Tomorrow People (1992–1995)
- Kate Todd (born 1987)
  - Strange Days at Blake Holsey High (1 episode, 2002)
  - Radio Free Roscoe (2003-2005)
  - Real Access (1 episode, 2004)
  - More Sex & the Single Mom (2005)
- Jacob Tremblay (born 2006)
  - The Smurfs 2 (2013)
  - Motive (1 episode, 2013)
  - The Magic Ferret (short film, 2013)
  - Mr. Young (1 episode, 2013)
  - My Mother's Future Husband (2014)
  - Santa's Little Ferrets (short film, 2014)
  - Extraterrestrial (2014)
  - Gord's Brother (short film, 2015)
  - Take Flight - The New York Times (short film, 2015)
  - Room (2015)
  - Before I Wake (2016)
  - Burn Your Maps (2016)
  - Shut In (2016)
  - Donald Trump's The Art of the Deal: The Movie (2016)
  - The Last Man on Earth (1 episode, 2016)
  - American Dad! (voice, 2 episodes, 2016-2017)
  - The Book of Henry (2017)
  - Wonder (2017)
  - Family Guy (voice, 1 episode, 2017)
  - Pete the Cat (voice, 2017-2022)
  - The Predator (2018)
  - The Death & Life of John F. Donovan (2018)
  - Animals (1 episode, 2018)
  - NKPC: New Kid Placement Committee (short film, 2018)
  - The Twilight Zone (1 episode, 2019)
  - Good Boys (2019)
  - Doctor Sleep (2019)
  - Harley Quinn (voice, 2019-present)
  - Here We Are: Notes for Living on Planet Earth (voice, short film, 2020)
  - Luca (voice, 2021)
  - Ciao Alberto (voice, short film, 2021)
  - My Father's Dragon (voice, 2022)
  - The Little Mermaid (voice, 2023)
  - Invincible: Atom Eve (voice, 2023)
  - Cold Copy (2023)
  - The Toxic Avenger (2023)
  - Queen of Bones (2023)
  - Orion and the Dark (voice, 2024)
- Kate Todd (born 1987)
  - Radio Free Roscoe (2003–2005)

== V ==
- Asia Vieira (born 1982)
  - The Good Mother (1988)
  - The Kissing Place (1990)
  - Street Legal (24 episodes, 1990-1993)
  - E.N.G. (1 episode, 1991)
  - Omen IV: The Awakening (1991)
  - Used People (1992)
  - The Adventures of Dudley the Dragon (33 episodes, 1994-1997)
  - A Holiday to Remember (1995)
  - The Magic School Bus (voice, 3 episodes, 1995-1996)
  - Flash Forward (1995-1997)
  - Wind at My Back (1 episode, 1996)
  - Goosebumps (1 episode, 1998)
  - Are You Afraid of the Dark? (1 episode, 1999)
  - Tales from the Cryptkeeper (voice, 1 episode, 1999)
  - Twice in a Lifetime (1 episode, 2000)

== W ==
- Aaron Webber (born 1989)
  - A Summer Fling (2004)
  - Whole New Thing (2005)
  - A Stone's Throw (2006)
- Dale Whibley (born 1997)
  - Life with Boys (1 episode, 2012)
  - Degrassi: The Next Generation (6 episodes, 2013-2014)
  - Max & Shred (2 episodes, 2014-2015)
  - Len and Company (2015)
  - Make It Pop (2015-2016)
- Finn Wolfhard (born 2002)
  - Aftermath (2013)
  - The Resurrection (2013)
  - The 100 (2014)
  - Supernatural (2015)
  - Stranger Things (2016–2025)
  - It (2017)
  - Dog Days (2018)
  - The Addams Family (2019)
  - Night Shifts (2020)

== Z ==
- Noam Zylberman (born 1973)
  - The Raccoons (1985-1990)
- Kevin Zegers (born 1984)
  - Air Bud film series (1997–2002)
