= One Terrible Day =

1922 film

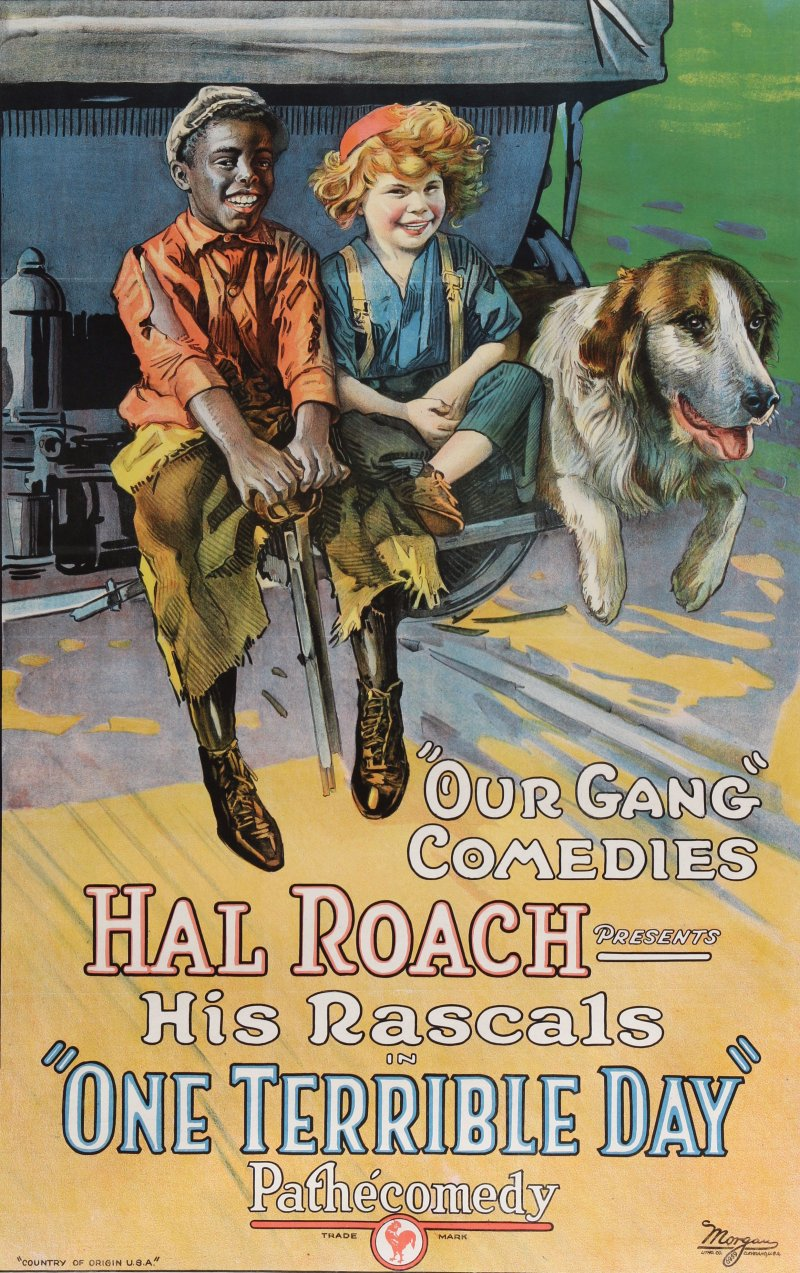
- Directed by: Charley Chase; Robert F. McGowan; Tom McNamara
- Written by: Hal Roach; H. M. Walker; Tom McNamara
- Produced by: Hal Roach
- Starring: Ed Brandenburg; Peggy Cartwright; Jackie Condon; Mickey Daniels; Jack Davis; Weston Doty; Winston Doty; William Gillespie; Helen Gilmore; Clara Guiol; Allen Hoskins; Wallace Howe; Ernie Morrison; Charles Stevenson
- Distributed by: Pathé
- Release date: September 10, 1922
- Running time: 20 minutes
- Country: United States
- Languages: Silent film English intertitles

One Terrible Day is a 1922 American silent short film, the first entry in Hal Roach's Our Gang (Little Rascals) series to be released. Directed by Robert F. McGowan and Tom McNamara, the two-reel short was released to theaters on September 10, 1922 by Pathé.

This was the first Our Gang comedy to be released, although the fourth to be produced. The gang's leading lady in this film is Peggy Cartwright, who makes only a brief appearance in the company of an unnamed character at the country estate.

Allen Hoskins’s character in this early short is female. His character will not start taking on male characteristics until the 1923 short, The Champeen, when he dresses like a boy for the first time. This is very similar to what happened with the Buckwheat character years later.

When the television rights for the original silent Pathé Our Gang comedies were sold to National Telepix and other distributors, several of the films were released into television syndication and retitled. In 1960 the collective title Our Gang was changed to Mischief Makers; One Terrible Day was changed to The Outing. Two-thirds of the original footage from the film was included. Most of the original inter-titles were also cut and later replaced. The film, having been produced prior to 1923, and never having the copyright renewed, is in the public domain. However, the "Mischief Makers" additions to the film were copyrighted in 1960.

== Plot ==
Wealthy Mrs. Pennington Van Renssalaer, upon hearing of a rival socialite's gathering of "settlement children" for a "lawn fete", decides to conduct a similar picnic of her own. Five boys show up at her house and present her secretary Alvira, played by Clara Guilol, with their invitations. The five boys are Mickey Daniels, Jack Davis, a tall boy wearing glasses and having a snobbish attitude, and the twins, Winston and Weston Doty. Just as Mrs. Van Renssalaer, with her pet monkey, comes out of the house, Booker T. Bacon arrives with his little sister Farina in tow in her toy wagon. Neither of these two children have an invitation. When Alvira tells Jackie that he cannot come because he does not have an invitation either, Jackie's dog chases her down the street until she is forced to climb a tree out of fright. The monkey gets excited and jumps down, to be chased by Mrs. Van Renssalaer's chauffeur, (played by William Gillespie), who gets doused with water when the monkey finds a garden hose and turns it on him. When things finally settle down, Mrs. Van Renssalaer, Alvira, the chauffeur, and the five boys get into the limousine. Unbeknownst to them, however, Booker and Jackie stow away on the tailgate with Jackie's dog sitting beside them, and Farina being pulled along in her little toy wagon.

After they get going, Mickey starts flying his kite behind the car, but Mrs. Van Renssalaer's monkey grabs the kite's tail and is hoisted up into the sky. When the string breaks, the monkey falls. The chauffeur has to get out of the car and rescue the monkey and when he returns, he discovers the stowaways in the rear of the limousine. Mrs. Van Renssalaer tells him to let all the children and the dog ride in the car. After they get going again, the limousine has a blowout. While the chauffeur is changing the tire, the kids start playing with the unused tire. When the chauffeur gets his tire back, he tries to replace it on the car, but the kids continue to pester him. He picks one child up and sets him aside, only to find another child standing there. He continues to set the children aside, one at a time, not noticing that the children are tricking him by running around to the end of the line to be lifted aside again. Finally, the chauffeur gets the tire replaced and tells the children to get into the car. But the kids trick him again. As they get in the car, they run across and exit the car on the other side and get back in line to get back into the car. The chauffeur catches on and makes all the children get in and sit down.

They finally arrive at the country estate and the kids play for a while in the house, making a mess of things and breaking a lamp, until Mrs. Van Renssalaer drives them outside where they entertain themselves by torturing the animals and swimming in the fountain in their long-handles, only to be interrupted when Peggy Cartwright comes riding up on a mule. They can't get dressed because the monkey has stolen their clothes, so they hide in the barn. Peggy goes into the house and the boys get dressed and come out of the barn. They then decide to become bullfighters, but get scared and wind up cowering in a tree, only to be ridiculed by Peggy, who explains that the ‘’bull’’ is actually a cow.

When the butler, played by Charles Stevenson, tells the kids to come into the house for dinner, they sit down at the table. Meanwhile, the monkey steals Mrs. Van Renssalaer's pearls and climbs up onto the chandelier. The boys climb up on the table to get it down, ruining the meal. The gang chases the monkey all over the house. The monkey gets away and stashes the pearls on Farina. It's finally time to go home, and they all pile back into the car. But before they get back to town, they have another blowout, bringing the show to an end.

== Cast ==
=== Gallery ===
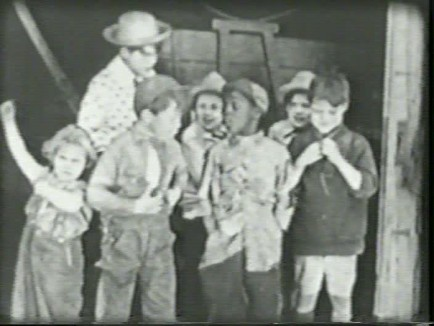

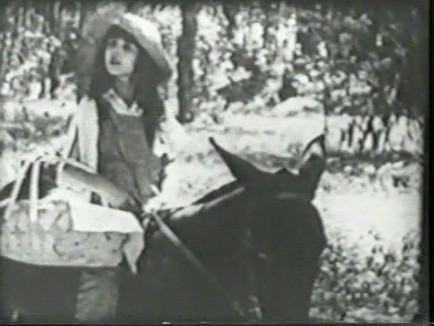
Peggy Cartwright riding Dinah the Mule

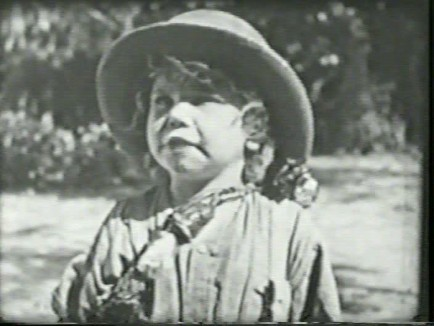
Jackie Condon

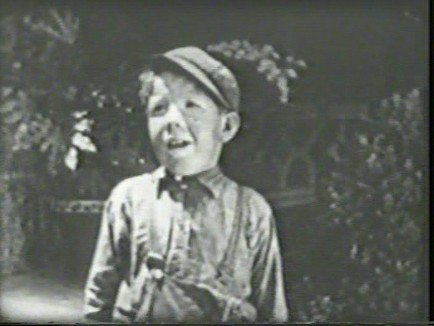
Mickey Daniels

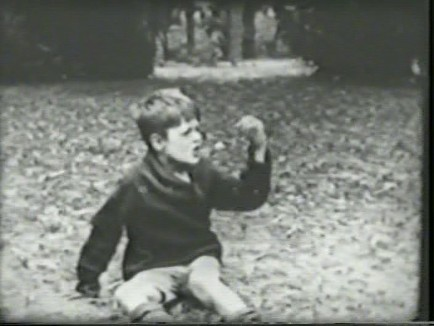
Jack Davis

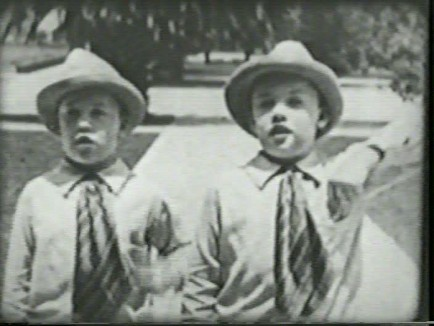
Winston and Weston Doty

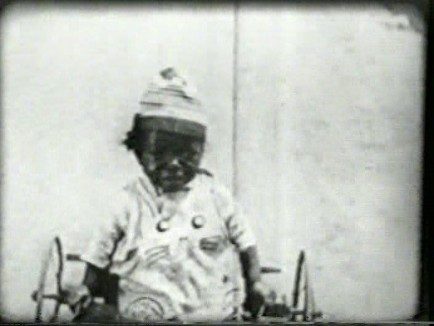
Allen Hoskins
- Peggy Cartwright – Her first appearance in the film is when she is seen riding up on Dinah the Mule while the boys are playing in the fountain in their undies. Later she has to explain the difference between a cow and a bull to the boys.
- Jackie Condon – Jackie is the little boy with the wild hair and is accompanied by the large dog, probably a Golden Retriever. He does not have an invitation, so he stows away in the back of the limousine. At the country estate, he teases a horse by throwing water in the horse's face. Later the horse gets revenge by pushing him in the water.
- Mickey Daniels – The freckle faced little boy who is the first to arrive at Mrs. Van Renssalaer's mansion with an invitation. He seems to be the leader of the gang and most of the story revolves around him. He and Ernie are the ones who later aspire to be bull fighters.
- Jack Davis – Jack is the second boy to arrive at the mansion, although his invitation is folded into a paper airplane. He is the one who comes up with the idea of using the fountain for a swimming pool.
- Weston Doty – The Doty twins get their best exposure when they present their invitations to Alvira. Their speech and gestures are all done in unison.
- Winston Doty – Winston and Weston are ensemble actors throughout the film.
- Allen Hoskins – Farina – Allen plays the part of Booker T.’s little sister, a little African American child, first seen riding in a toy wagon. During the scene where the chauffeur is changing the tire, she hides under the car. Later, she and Jackie try fishing in the fountain and Jackie uses one of her pigtails for bait.
- Ernie Morrison – Booker T. Bacon - Ernie is the African American who does not have an invitation and convinces Jackie that they can still go if they stow away in the back of the limousine. During the scene where the chauffeur is changing the tire, he convinces the other boys to let him get inside the tire and then roll him down the hill. Later he and Mickey try their hands at bull fighting, not knowing the difference between a cow and a bull.
- Unknown Child Actor - plays the tall boy wearing glasses, although it is an ensemble part throughout the film. When he arrives at the mansion, he has a snooty attitude, which causes Mickey to take great delight in making fun of him. As the story progresses, however, he does loosen up a bit and plays well with the other children.

=== Adults ===
- Ed Brandenburg – the cook – He has a small part as the operator of a sidewalk café where the monkey lands after falling from the kite.
- William Gillespie – the chauffeur who chases the monkey and gets squirted with the garden hose. He is tormented by the boys when they continue to pester him while he is changing the tire. When Farina is found hiding under the car, he crawls under the car to retrieve her, but the monkey gets into the driver’s seat, and pulls a lever, which spills oil on the chauffeur’s face.
- Helen Gilmore – Caroline Culpepper – Society Reporter for "The Tattler". She shows Mrs. Van Renssalaer an article about a rival socialite's party. Her long haired cat also tangles with the monkey. She is listed by the Internet Movie Data Base and The Lucky Corner as Carlene Culpepper. However, her business card has the name printed as Caroline Culpepper.
- Clara Guiol – Alvira, Mrs. Van Rensselaer's secretary. She is seen receiving the boys at the mansion and accepting their invitations. She is affronted when Mrs. Van Rensselaer's monkey mimics her with reading glasses. Throughout the film, she and Mrs. Van Rensselaer react to the children's antics with snooty snobbishness.
- Wallace Howe – The Policeman who stops the limousine at the intersection just before the car has a blowout.
- Charles Stevenson – The Butler at the country estate.
- Fanny Kelly – Mrs. Pennington Van Renssalaer, who invites the local children on the outing to her country estate. She has a pet monkey and is the butt of many of the sight jokes because of her wealthy snootiness.
- Unknown actress - the maid (caucasian) - She is seen applying beauty cream to Mrs. Van Renssalaer's neck during the opening scene of the film. She later carries the monkey into the kitchen.
- Unknown actress - the maid (African-American) - She appears briefly and gets a face full of beauty cream courtesy of Caroline Culpepper's cat.
- Unknown actress - Lady seen with Peggy Cartwright outside of the country estate.
- Unknown actor - Man riding in the front seat of the limousine next to the chauffeur.

=== Animals ===
- Dinah the Mule, ridden by Peggy, when she almost discovers the boys swimming in their underwear.
- Golden Retriever, belonging to Jackie – Because of its size the dog causes considerable grief to the wealthy matron and her secretary while riding in the limousine.
- Monkey, owned by the wealthy matron – The monkey offends Mrs. Van Renssalaer's secretary and douses the butler with water. Later, the monkey is hoisted into the air when it grabs hold of the tail of Mickey's kite.
- Cat, belonging to Caroline Culpepper – this long haired feline climbs the drapes in Mrs. Van Renssalaer's house and ultimately ends up slinging a big glob of beauty cream into a housemaid's face.
- Various farm animals – The kids are seen tormenting the goats by pulling their tails, throwing water in the horse's face, chasing the turkeys and geese, and playing bullfighter with the cow.

=== Questionable listings ===
- Mary Kornman, listed by Internet Movie Database. However, according to The Lucky Corner, she does not actually appear in the film.
- Lincoln Stedman, also listed by Maltin and Bann as well as Internet Movie Database as the secretary. However, according to The Lucky Corner, he does not actually appear in the film.

== The Crew ==
- Produced by Hal Roach
- Supervised by Charles Parrott, (Charley Chase)
- Directed by Robert F. McGowan and Tom McNamara
- Titles by H. M. Walker and Tom McNamara
- Story by Hal Roach and Tom McNamara
- Distributed by Pathé

== Sequence ==
Succeeding Short: Fire Fighters (film) (1922)

== Production ==
One Terrible Day was one of four Our Gang comedies produced by Roach Studios in the spring and early summer of 1922. The pilot film, Our Gang, went into production in April, and Fire Fighters began in early May. Young Sherlocks was produced in April and May, and One Terrible Day in early July. Roach showed all four films in the Los Angeles area throughout the summer for the benefit of the critics to "smash critical reaction." Of the four, Roach decided to release the film to the public first. Consequently, One Terrible Day was the fourth Our Gang film to enter production, but the first to be released.

== Reception ==
According to Maltin and Bann, The New York Post’s critic column said, "The best thing on the Rivoli Theater program this week is the funniest comedy shown for some time, One Terrible Day, bringing forth screams of laughter." The New York Herald said, "The outstanding hit of the bill at the Rivoli is a rollicking Pathé comedy, One Terrible Day." The New York World also commented by calling the film "extremely funny."

== Technical details ==
- One Terrible Day was designated at Roach Studios as Production A-4 and was filmed from May 22 to June 10, 1922. It was released on September 10, 1922 and was the first Our Gang film in the series to be released.
- The original copyright was recorded on October 9, 1922, by Pathé Exchange, Inc. Registration no. LU18286.
- The film was a silent two-reeler, approximately 20 minutes in length. Subsequent editing has reduced the film to about 15 minutes.
- Extant lobby posters indicate that the original opening title card probably read: '"Our Gang" Comedies - Hal Roach presents His Rascals in One Terrible Day.' The title of some of the early Our Gang films read '"Our Gang" Comedy' or '"Our Gang" Series.'
- The film was released into TV syndication as Mischief Makers episode no. 1043, "The Outing," copyrighted September 1, 1960, with registration number LP17348.
