= Peggy Cartwright =

Canadian silent film actress (1912–2001)

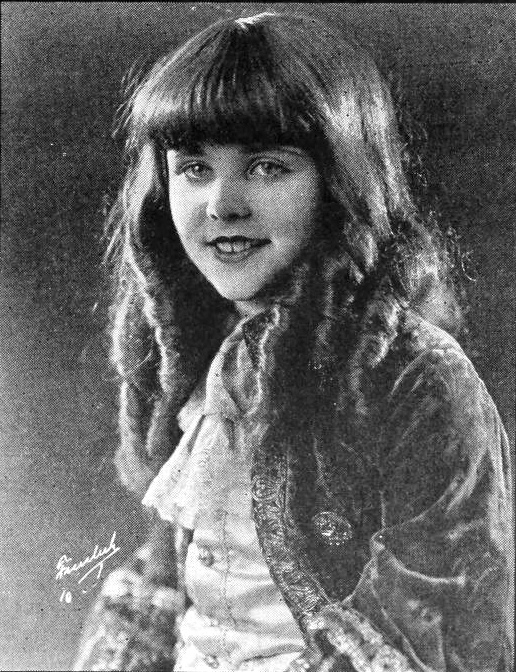
- Cartwright c. 1923
- Born: November 14, 1912; Vancouver, British Columbia, Canada
- Died: June 12, 2001 (aged 88); Victoria, British Columbia, Canada
- Other name: Peggy Courtwright
- Occupation: Actress
- Years active: 1915–1964
- Known for: One Terrible Day; Fire Fighters; Young Sherlocks; A Quiet Street
- Spouses: Phil Baker (m. 1932; div. 1941) William "Bill" Walker (m. 1962; died 1992)
- Children: 4

Peggy Cartwright (November 14, 1912 – June 12, 2001) was a Canadian silent film actress and for a short time a leading lady of the Our Gang comedy series during the silent film era.

== Early life and career ==
Peggy Cartwright was a child actress born on November 14, 1912, in Vancouver, British Columbia. She appeared in several of the early Our Gang short films from the silent film era; although her appearances would solely be those released in 1922.

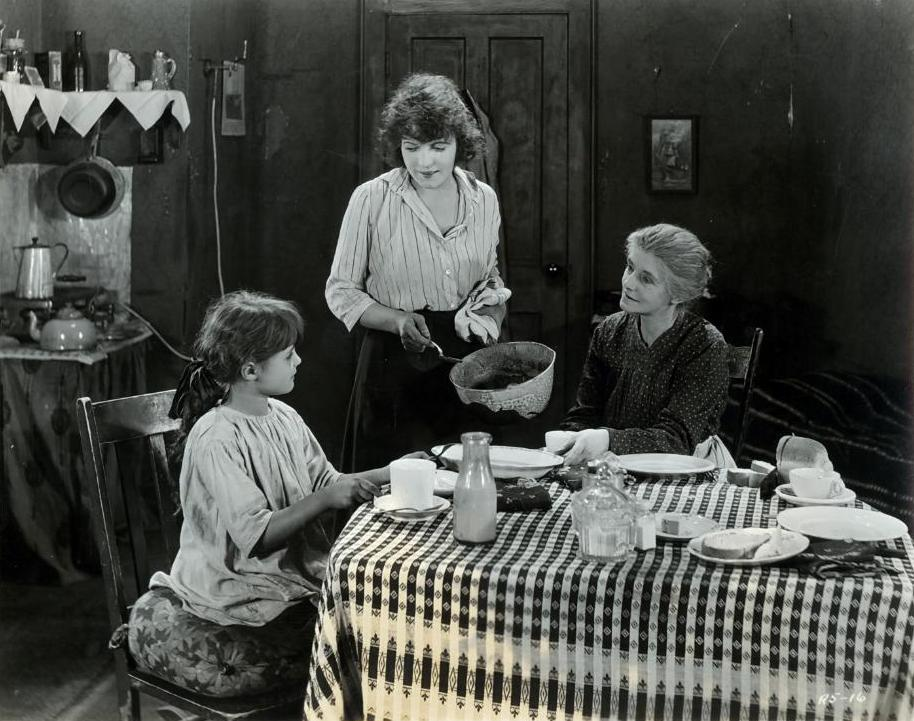
Cartwright in 1920. She is seen here alongside Louise Glaum in a publicity still from the silent drama Love

As Cartwright's career was beginning to advance, her father—a doctor—insisted that his family return to Canada in order that his children receive decent scholarships. Subsequently, Cartwright continued her studies in Vancouver. She later became proficient in Russian ballet.

In 1927, Cartwright traveled with her mother to London, where she entered RADA. Two years later, she worked on the London stage at the St. Martin's Theater.

In 1931, she briefly returned to filming, first with a minor role in Victor Saville's The Faithful Heart (which would be released in 1932). She also appeared as Greta, together with Jack Buchanan and Anna Neagle, in the musical film Goodnight, Vienna. The same year, Cartwright performed in the British drama film Hindle Wakes, which would prove to be the final film in which she would appear. In late 1931 and 1932 she starred in the title role of "Mike" in the hit West End play with music For the Love of Mike at the Saville Theatre.

Shortly thereafter, Cartwright relocated to New York, where she married comedian Phil Baker, with whom she subsequently had four children: Margot, Stuart, Michael, and Susan. She divorced Baker in 1941, and later married actor William "Bill" Walker in 1962.

== Later years ==
When her children reached adulthood, Cartwright obtained a job as a secretary in Los Angeles. Here, she became acquainted with William Walker, whom she later married. They remained married until his death in 1992.

Cartwright made an appearance at the 12th International Sons of the Desert Convention in 2000. This was her first and only appearance at the convention, and she happily discussed her brief tenure in the Our Gang series. She was the last surviving member of the original Our Gang group of children.

=== Death ===
Cartwright died on June 12, 2001 in Victoria, British Columbia at the age of 88. She and Walker, a United States Army World War I veteran, are buried at Riverside National Cemetery in Riverside, California.

== Filmography ==
- The Birth of a Nation (1915) - Young Girl in Cabin (uncredited)
- Intolerance (1916) - Little Girl (uncredited)
- A Kentucky Cinderella (1917)
- The Poor Boob (1919) - Little Girl (uncredited)
- From Hand to Mouth (1919, Short) - The Waif
- The Third Generation (1920) - Nancy Jane
- Love (1920) - Beatrice Storm
- Penrod (1922) - (uncredited)
- Afraid to Fight (1922) - Sally Harper
- Robin Hood, Jr. (1923) - The Girl, later Maid Marian
- A Lady of Quality (1924) - Clorinda (age 6)
- The Iron Horse (1924) - Miriam as a Girl (uncredited)
- Hindle Wakes (1931) - (uncredited)
- Goodnight, Vienna (1932) - Greta
- The Faithful Heart (1932) - (final film role)

=== Our Gang ===
- One Terrible Day (1922, Short) - Girl At Estate
- Fire Fighters (1922, Short) - Peggy
- Young Sherlocks (1922, Short) - Mary Jane
- A Quiet Street (1922, Short) - Banty's Sister (uncredited)
