= Our Gang (film) =

1922 short film

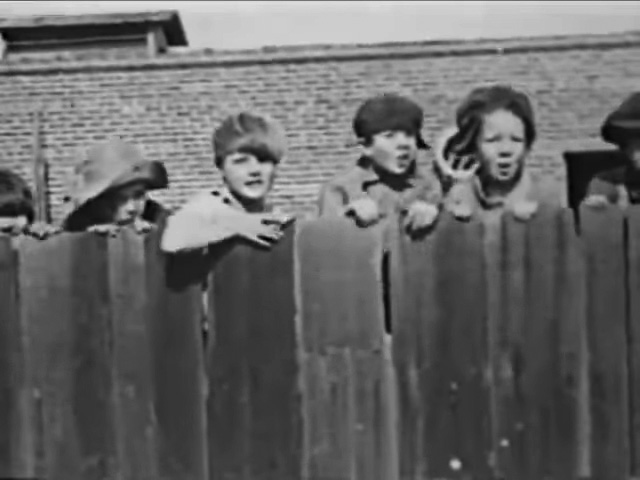
- Directed by: Charley Chase; Robert F. McGowan; Tom McNamara; Fred Newmeyer
- Written by: Robert F. McGowan; Hal Roach; H. M. Walker
- Produced by: Hal Roach
- Starring: Ernest Morrison; John Hatton; Anna Mae Bilson; Jackie Condon; Mickey Daniels; Helen Gilmore; Wallace Howe; Mark Jones; Charley Young
- Distributed by: Pathé Exchange
- Release date: November 5, 1922
- Running time: 20 minutes
- Country: United States
- Languages: silent film English intertitles

Our Gang (incomplete)

Our Gang (1922) is an American silent comedy short film. It was produced as the first of what became known as the Our Gang series, but was held back as the third entry in the series to be released. It was directed by Charley Chase, Robert F. McGowan, Tom McNamara, and Fred Newmeyer. The two-reel short was released into theaters on November 5, 1922 by Pathé.

== Plot ==
Jimmy is trying to obtain the affections of Mary Jane. Mary Jane, however, is not interested in Jimmy, but rather is interested in rich kid Pat. The gang tries to help Sunshine Sammy get some clothes. They lure rich Pat into a trap in order to steal his clean clothes, but Pat beats them up. The gang then offers Pat a place in the gang, and they cut his hair and trade clothes with him. When Mary Jane sees Pat, she is disgusted. She soon sees Jimmy and Jackie wearing their new outfits. Later, Mary Jane's mother is trying to attract some customers to her store while competing with a popular rival store across the street. Sunshine Sammy and Pat try to help Mary Jane by making the customers of the rival store think there are mad animals running around the store.

== Cast ==
=== The Gang ===
- Ernest Morrison as Ernie "Sunshine Sammy"
- John Hatton as rich kid
- Anna Mae Bilson as Mary Jane
- Billy Condon as Jimmy
- Mickey Daniels as Mickey
- Jackie Condon as Jackie
- Dinah the Mule as herself
- Bret Black as Gang member

=== Additional cast ===
- Helen Gilmore as Emil's wife
- Wallace Howe as the rival merchant
- Mark Jones as Emil, the drunk

== Production ==
- This short marked the first appearance of Our Gang regular Mickey Daniels.
- The only Our Gang short to feature Anna Mae Bilson, John Hatton, and Billy Condon.
- Charles Parrot, better known by the stage name Charley Chase served as the supervising director of Our Gang and two of the earlier releases in the series.
- Fred C. Newmeyer was chosen to direct the original version of the film (no longer extant), which was shot in January 1922. After preview screenings, Roach scrapped Newmeyer's version and had Robert F. McGowan and Tom McNamara come in to reshoot the short.

== Preservation status ==
For decades, no print of the film was known to survive. Various elements of the film eventually resurfaced however, and, by 2013, approximately half of the film had been found and compiled together into a new edit.

In 2024, a nearly complete print of the film was reconstructed and restored by the ClassicFlix company with the help of several private collectors and film archives. The first half of the film was restored after Joe Caputo, a private collector, found and purchased the last known 16mm print of the film in existence. The second half of the film and damaged or missing sections of the first half were restored from six different "cutdowns" ("Big Business, Dog Catches a Thief, The Donkey Delivery Company, Fickle Flora, Taken By Surprise, and Who's A Sissy?") found in the Collection of Robin J. Cook. Additional damaged and missing sections were provided by Paul Mular of the Niles Essany Silent Film Museum, and the titles and inter titles for the second half of the film were reconstructed by Michelle Schracht. The restoration was completed by ClassicFlix, who subsequently released it as part the Blu-Ray/DVD collection The Little Rascals – the Restored Silents, Volume 1.

== See also ==
- Our Gang filmography
