= Winston and Weston Doty =

American child actors (1914–1934)

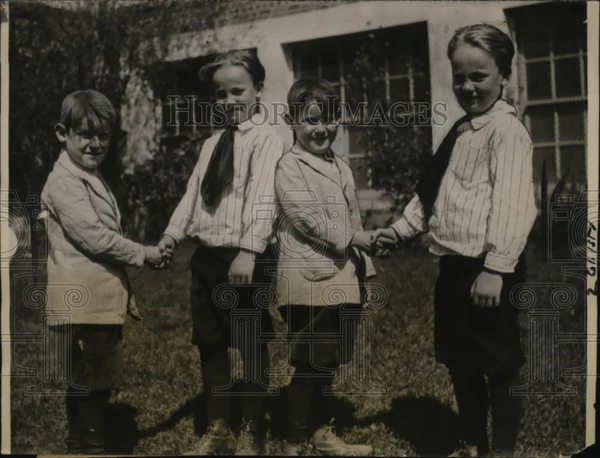
- Winston and Weston Doty (second from left and right) shaking hands with Lawrence and Lester Blockstock (left and second from right)
- Born: Winston and Wilson Doty; February 18, 1914; Malta, Ohio, U.S.
- Died: January 1, 1934 (aged 19); Montrose, California, U.S.
- Resting place: Woodlawn Memorial Cemetery, Santa Monica, CA U.S.
- Occupation: Film actors
- Years active: 1922–1924
- Known for: Crescenta Valley flood

Winston and Weston Doty (February 18, 1914 – January 1, 1934) were twin child actors active for several years during the silent film era. They were known for playing child twins in Our Gang and Peter Pan during the silent era. They also started cheerleading in the University of Southern California.

The Doty twins were among the casualties of the Crescenta Valley flood (the "New Year Flood of 1934") .

== Biography ==
Winston and Weston – originally Winston and Wilson, though the latter was later changed after the two began appearing in silent films – were born in Malta, Ohio, sons of Lawrence "Jack" and Olive Doty. Their father was a stage and radio actor who had separated from his wife when the boys were fairly young.

=== Careers ===
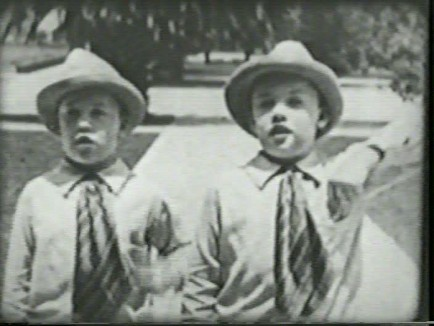
Winston and Weston Doty in One Terrible Day (1922)

The brothers lived with their mother in Chicago, Los Angeles, and later in Venice, California. Between 1922 and 1924 Winston and Weston Doty appeared in a handful of silent film shorts, among them "Our Gang," 1922 with Anna Mae Bilson and Jackie Condon, One Terrible Day, and one full-length feature, Peter Pan (1924). In 1930 Olive Doty was employed in Los Angeles as an investment manager while her boys clerked at a local grocery store after school hours. Later the twins enrolled together at the University of Southern California where they became popular members of the USC cheerleading squad.

=== Death and legacy ===
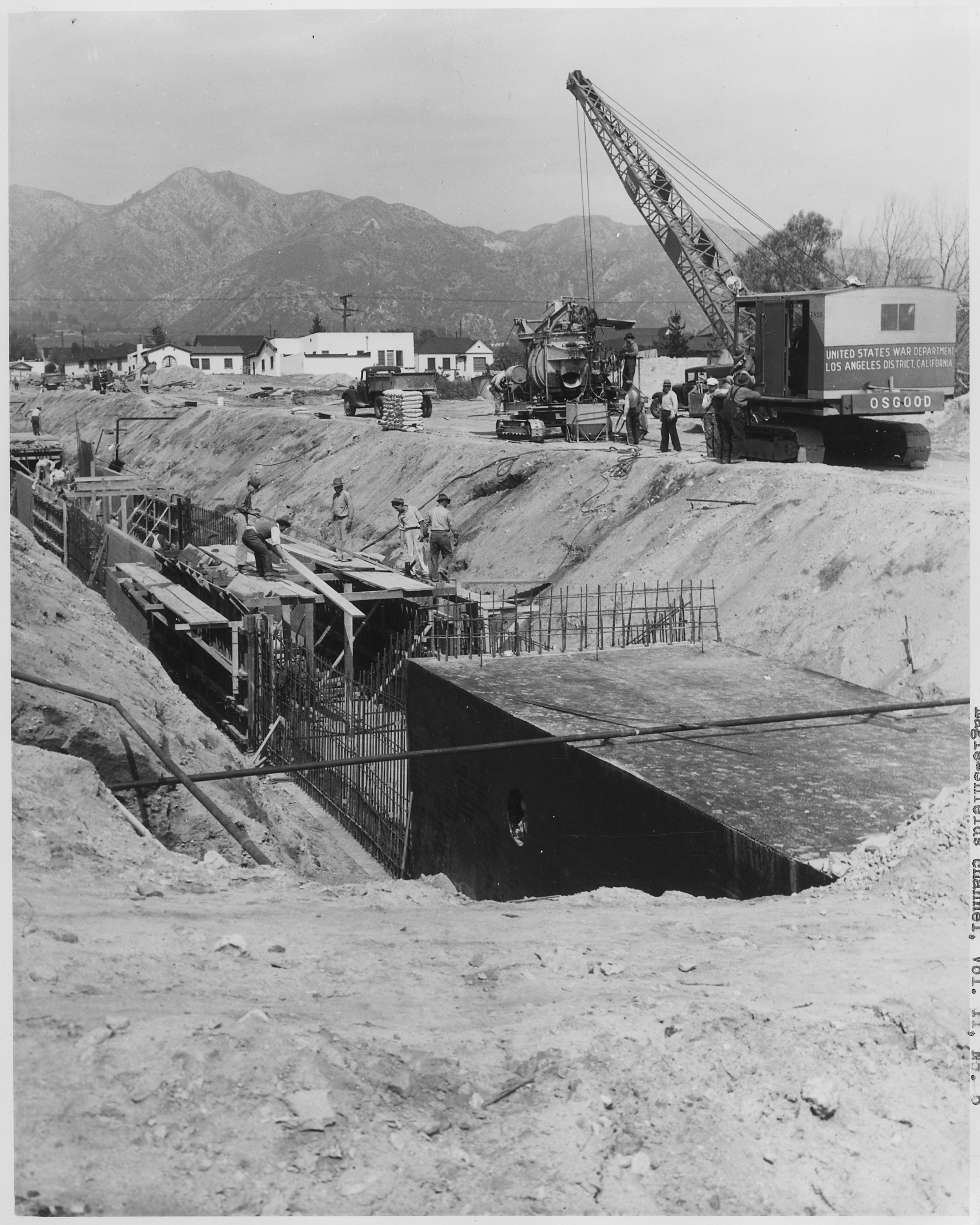
A tributary of the Los Angeles River being placed underground in storm drains in 1936. This work was partially inspired by the New Year's Flood which killed the Doty brothers.

In late 1933, wildfires burned many of the trees and much of the grass in the Crescenta Valley in Los Angeles County, California. In the final week of 1933, rain inundated communities in the Crescenta Valley including La Crescenta, Montrose, La Cañada, and Tujunga. On the night of December 31, 1933, the Doty brothers attended a party at a friend's house in Montrose with their dates: Mary Janet Cox (from the Venice neighborhood of Los Angeles) and Gladys Isabel Fisher (from Santa Monica). At midnight, the brothers called their mother to wish her a Happy New Year. At some point during the drive home, the Doty brothers and Weston's date (Gladys Isabel Fisher) perished when a deluge of water caused by heavy rains swept through the Crescenta Valley. The resulting flood killed scores of people, and destroyed hundreds of homes. Of the four in the Doty brothers' car, the only one to survive was Winston's date: Mary Janet Cox. The Montrose Flood, as it came to be known, was memorialized by Woody Guthrie in his song "Los Angeles New Year's Flood."

Winston and Weston were interred together at the Woodlawn Memorial Cemetery in Santa Monica.

In April 1935, the brothers' father Jack Doty, a radio actor, died alone in his hotel room in Chicago of a heart attack at the age of forty-two. Their mother Nancy later remarried and was widowed again in 1945. She died in 1975 and had no other children.
