= The Cobbler (1923 film) =

1923 film

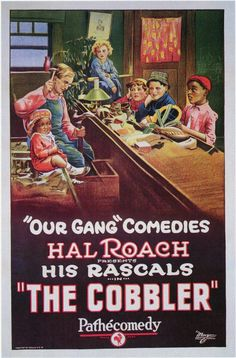
- Film poster
- Directed by: Tom McNamara
- Written by: Hal Roach; H. M. Walker
- Produced by: Hal Roach
- Starring: Jackie Condon; Mickey Daniels; Jack Davis; Allen Hoskins; Mary Kornman; Ernie Morrison; Richard Daniels; Dick Gilbert; Katherine Grant; Clara Guiol; Charley Young
- Distributed by: Pathé
- Release date: February 18, 1923
- Running time: 20 minutes
- Country: United States
- Languages: Silent film English intertitles

The Cobbler is the eighth Our Gang short subject comedy to be released. The Our Gang series (later known as "The Little Rascals") was created by Hal Roach in 1922, and continued production until 1944.

== Plot ==
After the gang wreaks havoc in the local cobbler's shop, the friendly cobbler takes them on a picnic, during which his old Model T breaks down. While the cobbler goes to the creek to fetch water for the radiator, the gang tries to do all sorts of repairs on the car, causing more problems. Mickey and Jack accidentally disturb the rest of a sleeping hobo, who then attempts to physically attack them. The gang rigs the car with a sail after their dog chases him off to get the car going again as they sail off into the sunset.

== Notes ==
- In one scene, the Gang's dog is “beaten up” and given a black eye by the cobbler's cat. The ring around the dog's eye is almost prophetic of the famous ring-around-the-eye trademark of the later Our Gang dog, Pete the Pup. In another scene, Jack wiggles his ear to impress Mary, a gag repeated years later by Alfalfa. Farina gorging herself in the watermelon patch is another very familiar gag in the Our Gang series.
- Mary Kornman is not a member of the gang, but a local rich girl who shows up at the cobbler's shop.
- When the television rights for the original silent Pathé Our Gang comedies were sold to National Telepix and other distributors, several episodes were retitled. This film was released into TV syndication as Mischief Makers in 1960 under the title "The Lucky Shoemaker". Approximately two-thirds of the original film was included. Some footage from the beginning of the short were used in the Mischief Makers hybrid episode "Play Ball!".

== Cast ==
=== The Gang ===
- Jackie Condon as Jackie
- Mickey Daniels as Mickey
- Jack Davis as Jack
- Allen Hoskins as Farina (female role)
- Ernie Morrison as Ernie

=== Additional cast ===
- Mary Kornman as Little Miss Riches
- Richard Daniels as Mr. Tuttle, the cobbler
- Dick Gilbert as Dandy Dick, the hobo
- Katherine Grant as Mary's nursemaid
- Clara Guiol as Customer
- Charley Young as postman
