= Boys to Board =

1923 film

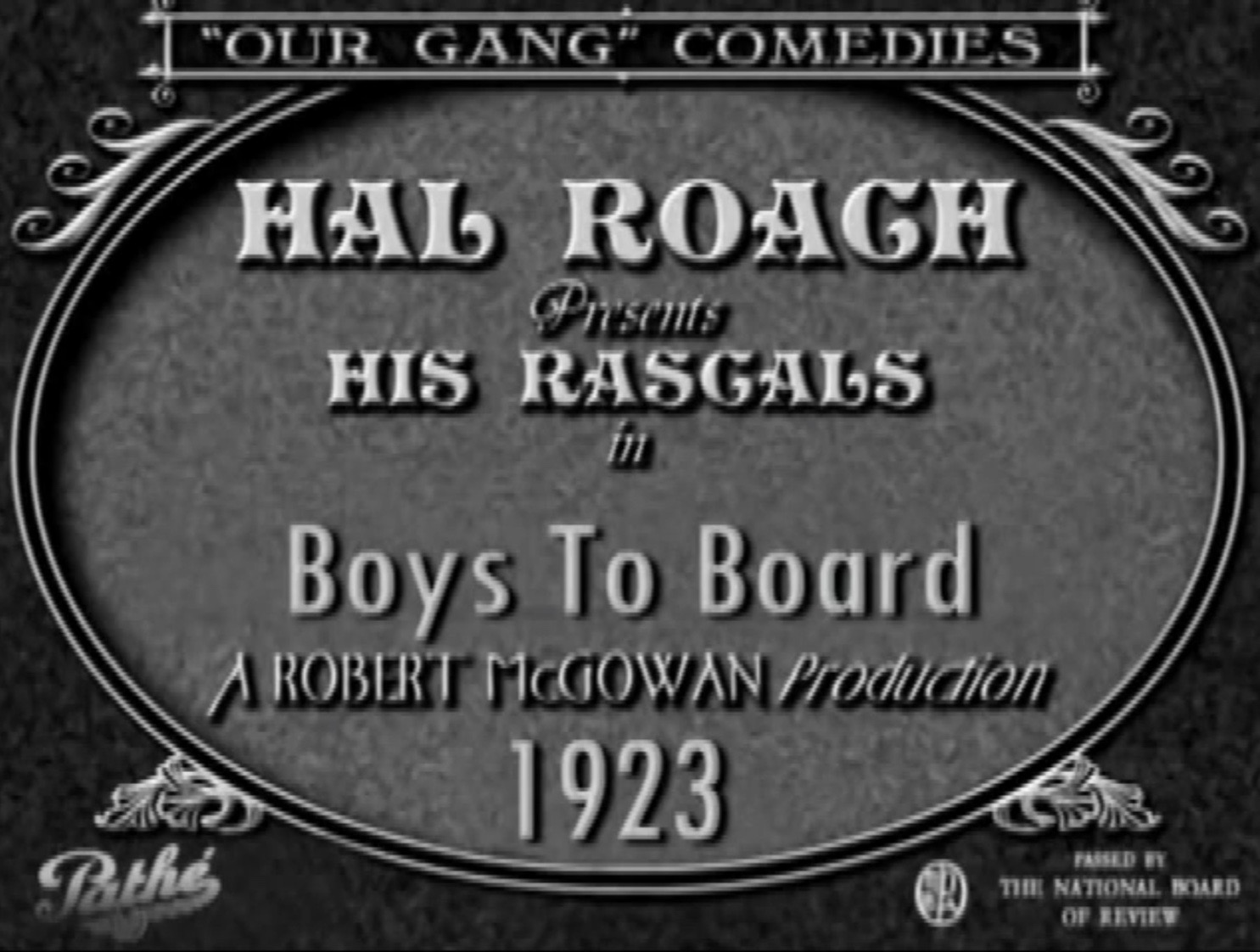
- Recreated title card
- Directed by: Tom McNamara
- Written by: Hal Roach; H. M. Walker; Tom McNamara
- Produced by: Hal Roach
- Starring: Joe Cobb; Jackie Condon; Mickey Daniels; Jack Davis; Allen Hoskins
- Distributed by: Pathé Exchange
- Release date: April 8, 1923 (U.S.)
- Running time: 20 minutes
- Country: United States
- Language: Silent (English intertitles)

Boys to Board is the 11th Our Gang short subject comedy to be released. The Our Gang series (later known as "The Little Rascals") was created by Hal Roach in 1922, and continued production until 1944.

== Plot ==
A kindly old school teacher helps the gang escape from his wife's miserable boarding school. While escaping, they run afoul of a bootlegger, who captures them and ties them up until the old school teacher rescues them just before the sheriff gets there. The school teacher returns to the boarding school and demands better treatment for the boys.

== See also ==
- Our Gang filmography

== Notes ==
Mary Kornman does not appear in this film.

When the television rights for the original silent Pathé Our Gang comedies were sold to National Telepix and other distributors, several episodes were retitled. This film was released into TV syndication as Mischief Makers in 1960 under the title "Boarding School". About two-thirds of the original film was included. All of the original inter-titles were cut.

== Cast ==
=== The Gang ===
- Joe Cobb as Joe
- Jackie Condon as Jackie
- Mickey Daniels as Mickey
- Jack Davis as Jack
- Allen Hoskins as Farina
- Ernie Morrison as Ernie 'Sunshine Sammy'
- Andy Samuel as Andy

=== Additional cast ===
- Richard Daniels as 'Pop' Malone
- Helen Gilmore as 'Mother' Malone
- Clara Guiol as Household Helper
- Wallace Howe as Sheriff
- Charles Stevenson as Moonshine Mose
