= The Idol of the North =

1921 film

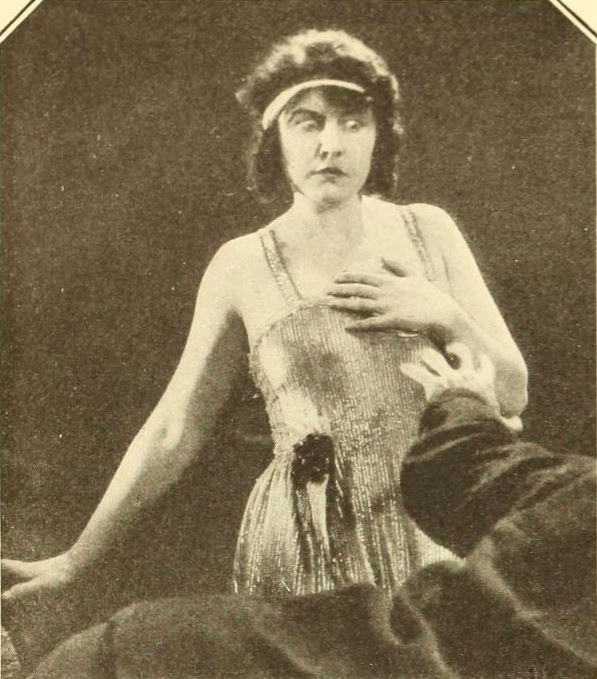
- Dorothy Dalton in the film
- Directed by: Roy William Neill
- Screenplay by: Frank S. Beresford; Tom McNamara
- Based on: "The Teaser" by J. Clarkson Miller
- Produced by: Adolph Zukor
- Starring: Dorothy Dalton; Edwin August; E.J. Ratcliffe; Riley Hatch; Jules Cowles; Florence St. Leonard
- Cinematography: Larry Williams
- Production company: Famous Players–Lasky Corporation
- Distributed by: Paramount Pictures
- Release date: March 27, 1921
- Running time: 60 minutes
- Country: United States
- Language: Silent (English intertitles)

The Idol of the North is a lost 1921 American silent drama film directed by Roy William Neill and written by Frank S. Beresford and Tom McNamara based upon a story by J. Clarkson Miller. The film stars Dorothy Dalton, Edwin August, E.J. Ratcliffe, Riley Hatch, Jules Cowles, and Florence St. Leonard. The film was released on March 27, 1921, by Paramount Pictures.

== Plot ==
As described in a film magazine, while Colette Brissac is inside a saloon in a northwestern gold camp begging for assistance her mother and father, who is a fugitive from the law, die outside the dance hall. She becomes an entertainer in the saloon and develops a cynical contempt for the men of the place, but soon becomes one of the big attractions of this crude stage. The men become angered at her attitude towards them and compel her to marry drunken stranger Martin Bates, a young engineer who has been spurned by a girl in New York. The two are thrown into a cabin and held virtually as prisoners. She has pity on his condition and remains as his wife. Martin regains his self-respect, strikes gold, and just as they are set to leave the camp the eastern girl appears seeking her former lover. Her husband, a Wall Street broker, follows her, bring the four into conflict, but there is a happy ending for the dance hall entertainer and her engineer husband.

== Cast ==
- Dorothy Dalton as Colette Brissac
- Edwin August as Martin Bates
- E. J. Ratcliffe as Lucky Folsom
- Riley Hatch as Ham Devlin
- Jules Cowles as One-Eye Wallace
- Florence St. Leonard as A Soubrette
- Jessie Arnold as Big Blond
- Marguerite Marsh as Gloria Waldron
- Joe King as Sergeant McNair
