= Crescenta Valley flood (1933 and 1934) =

Natural disaster in California, United States

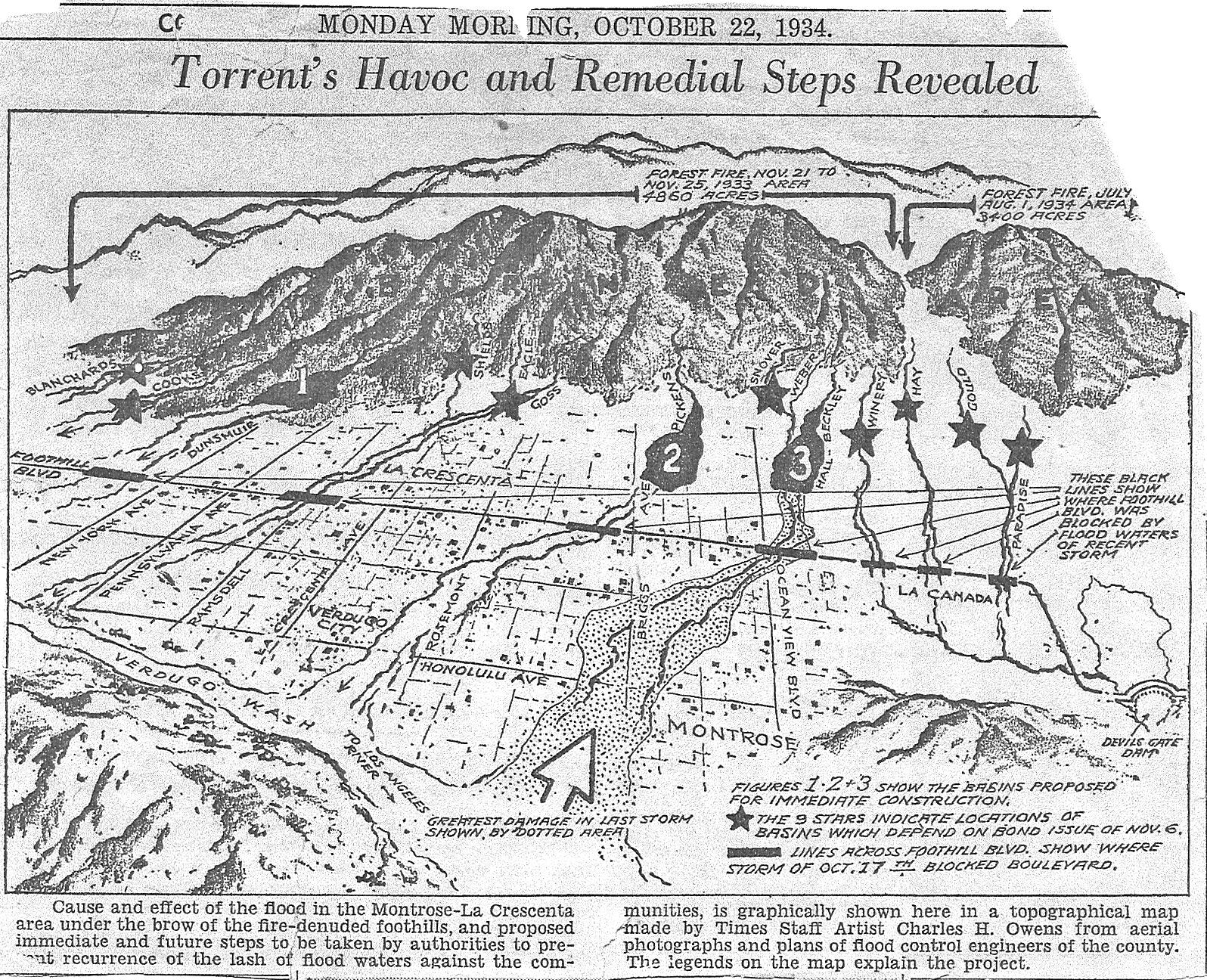
- Los Angeles Times illustration of the flood in October 1934
- Date: December 1933 until January 1934
- Location: Los Angeles County, California (specifically La Crescenta-Montrose, California)
- Deaths: 45 (or more)

The Crescenta Valley flood occurred in New Year's Eve 1933 (December 31, 1933) and extended to New Year's 1934 (January 1, 1934) in the Crescenta Valley in Los Angeles County, California, inundating communities in the valley including La Crescenta-Montrose, La Cañada, and Tujunga. This seemed to have happened because in late 1933, wildfires burned much of the trees and grass in the Crescenta Valley, leaving the cities in the lower parts of the valley vulnerable to flooding. On New Year's Eve, heavy rains led to the collapse of earthen dams, which in turn led to the destruction of many homes in the valley and many deaths.

== Background ==
In November 1933, wildfires raged through the nearby San Gabriel mountains above the communities of La Crescenta, La Cañada and Montrose. Earthen dams had been created by the Civilian Conservation Corps in three of the valleys (Dunsmore, Pickens and Hall-Beckley) to trap rainwater. During the last week of December of that year, a series of winter storms pounded the mountainside with 12 inches (300 mm) of rain. On New Year's Eve, more heavy rains led to sporadic flooding.

== New Year's ==
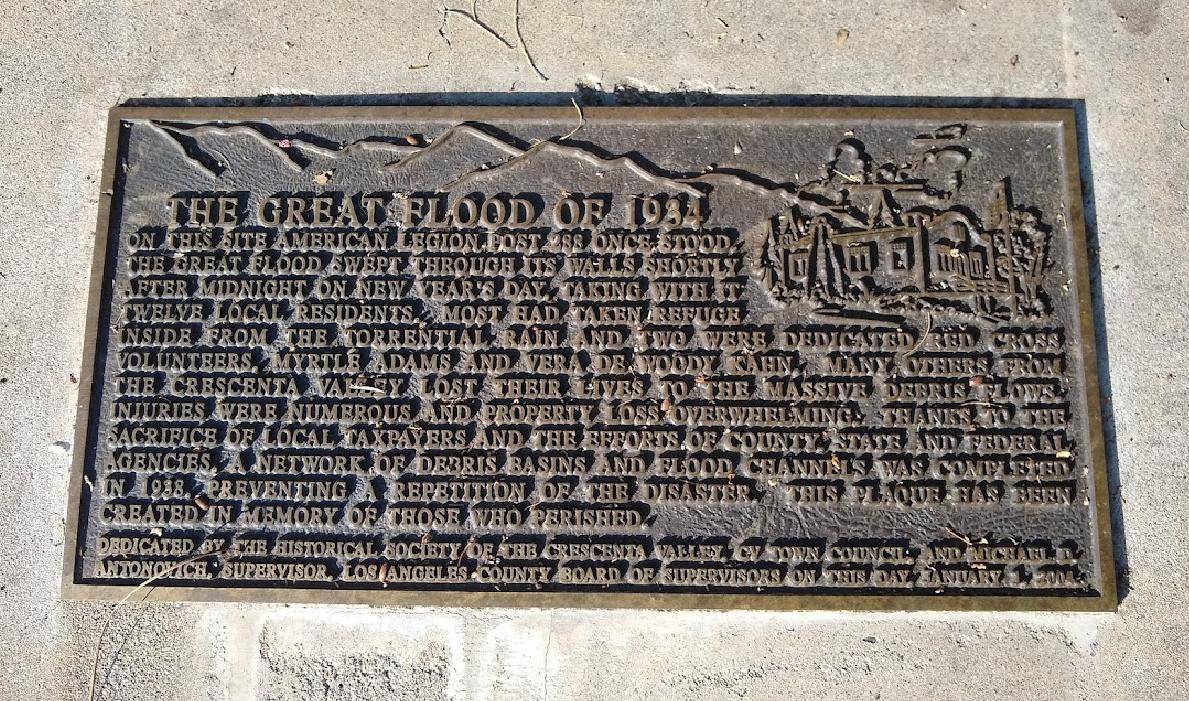
A picture of a commemorative plaque at site of former American Legion hall where 12 people were killed during the flood. The memorial can be found in the present unincorporated community frequently referred to as La Crescenta-Montrose, California.

Around midnight on December 31 (1933), the earthen dams above the Crescenta Valley collapsed, sending millions of tons of mud and debris into the neighborhoods below. The mudslides that began in the mountains above La Cañada and La Crescenta carved a path of destruction all the way to the Verdugo Wash and beyond.

== Aftermath ==
Some Montrose residents sought shelter from flooding at American Legion Post 288, which was destroyed, killing 12.

More than 400 homes were destroyed in La Cañada, La Crescenta, Montrose and Tujunga. Scores of people were killed, and hundreds were left homeless. Entire families were wiped out. Parts of Foothill Boulevard were buried under 12 feet (4 m) of mud, boulders and debris. The mud was deep enough to bury cars completely on Montrose Avenue. Miles of Honolulu Boulevard were inundated by several feet of sand and silt.

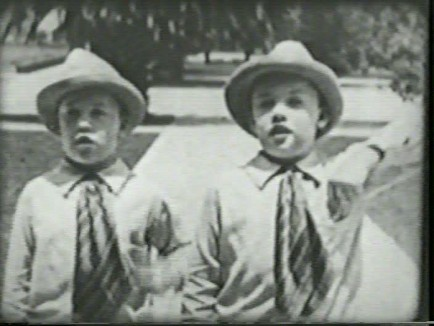
Silent film stars Winston and Weston Doty were among those killed in the flood. Winston's date for the evening (who was in Winston's and Weston's car at the time of the flood) was also killed.

Two notable victims of the flood were silent-era identical-twin child actors Winston and Weston Doty, who died at the age of 19.

== Reconstruction ==
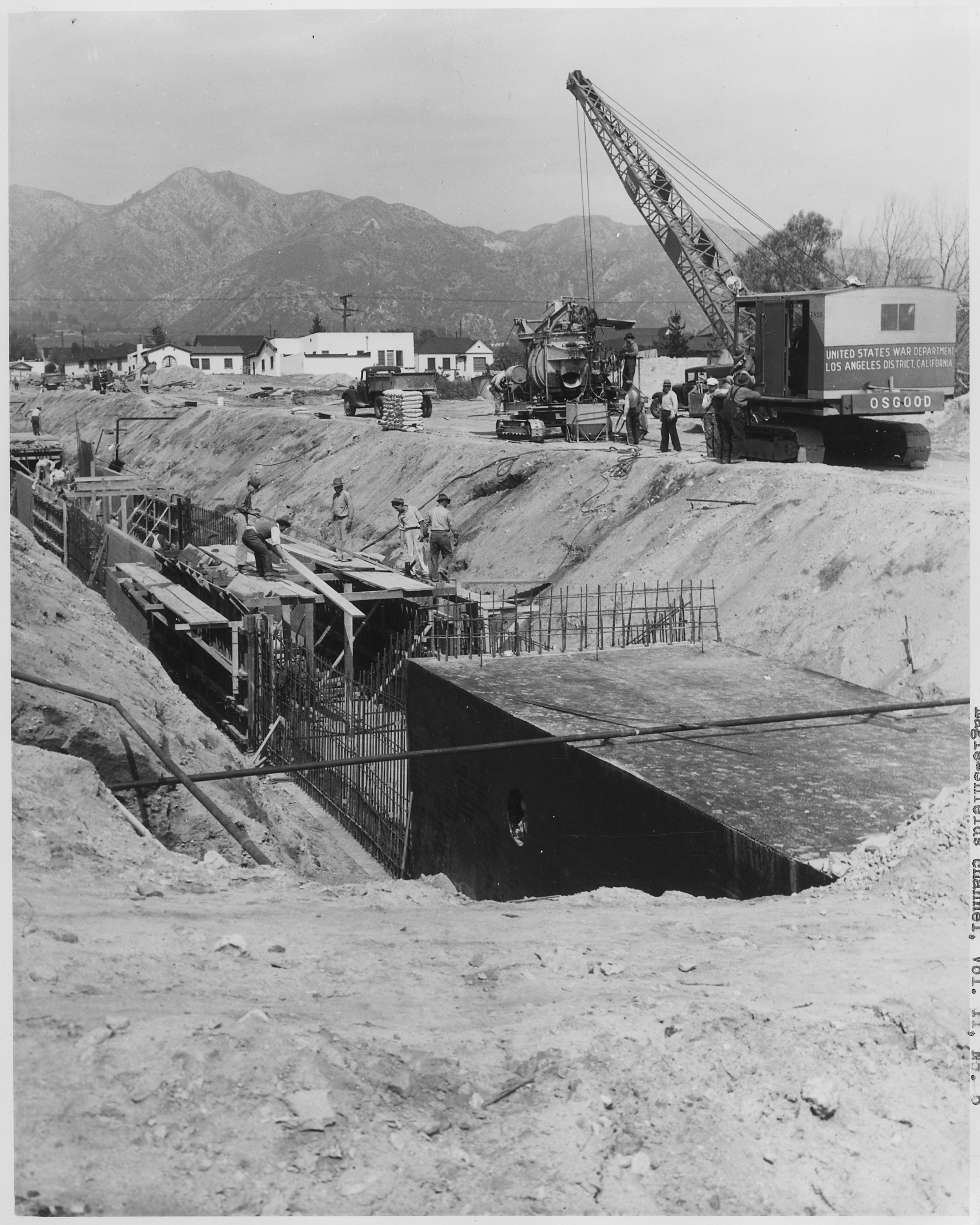
Storm drain under construction in 1936

Following the disaster, the U.S. Army Corps of Engineers and the County of Los Angeles (with the Los Angeles County Department of Public Works) built a flood control system of catch basins and concrete storm drains, designed to prevent a repeat of the 1933-1934 disaster.

The flood was commemorated in Woody Guthrie's song "Los Angeles New Year's Flood". To honor the victims of that New Year's calamity and to mark its 70th anniversary, a small monument was dedicated January 1, 2004, at Rosemont and Fairway avenues in Montrose, near where the American Legion Hall had stood.

== See also ==
- Bibliography of California history
