= Afraid to Fight =

1922 film directed by William Worthington

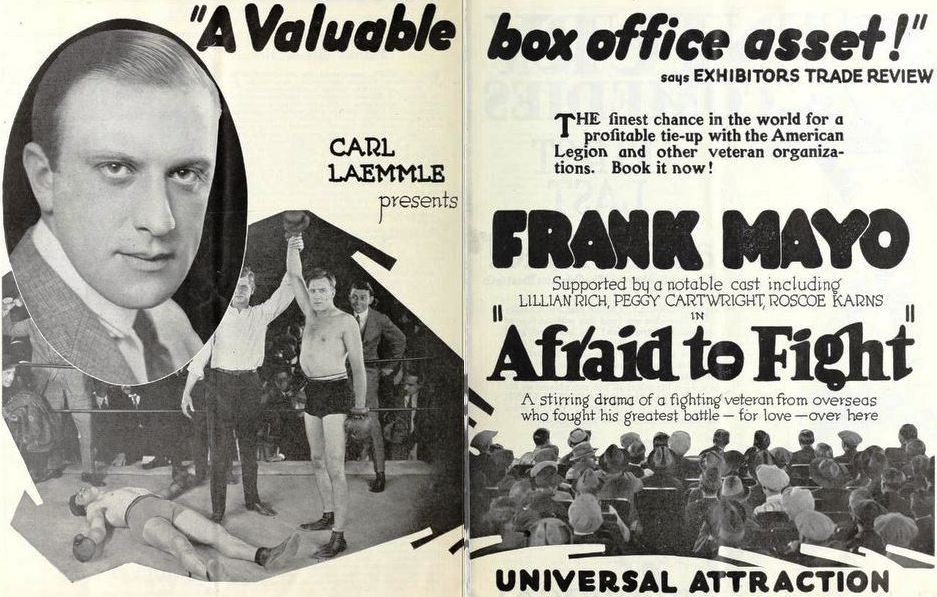
- Advertisement
- Directed by: William Worthington
- Screenplay by: Charles Sarver
- Story by: Leete Renick Brown
- Starring: Frank Mayo; Lillian Rich; Peggy Cartwright; Lydia Knott; W.S. McDunnough; Tom McGuire
- Cinematography: Arthur Reeves
- Production company: Universal Film Manufacturing Company
- Distributed by: Universal Film Manufacturing Company
- Release date: July 24, 1922
- Running time: 50 minutes
- Country: United States
- Language: Silent (English intertitles)

Afraid to Fight is a lost 1922 American silent drama film directed by William Worthington and written by Charles Sarver. The film stars Frank Mayo, Lillian Rich, Peggy Cartwright, Lydia Knott, W.S. McDunnough, and Tom McGuire. The film was released on July 24, 1922, by Universal Film Manufacturing Company.

== Plot ==
As described in a film magazine, Tom Harper is a former American Expeditionary Forces soldier, handy with his fists, but suffering the effects of being gassed during World War I. His crippled little sister Sally, he learns, can be cured of her invalidism if placed in the care of a specialist. As Tom is out of a job, Sally prays that Congress will pass the law and send him his bonus. A fight manager picks Tom up and sends him to the mountains for a rest cure on the condition that he will fight the boxing champion when he is well. While there he finds himself in love with Harriet Monroe, but is forced to take a beating from a rival as he is under orders not to fight until he is pronounced well. When he recovers, he whips the champion, wins enough money to have his little sister Sally cured, and goes back to the mountains to hand a trimming to the rival who had previously humiliated him.

== Cast ==
- Frank Mayo as Tom Harper
- Lillian Rich as Harriet Monroe
- Peggy Cartwright as Sally Harper
- Lydia Knott as Mrs. Harper
- W.S. McDunnough as Dr. Butler
- Tom McGuire as 'Big Jim' Brandon
- Harry Mann as Leonard
- Wade Boteler as Phillip Brand
- Al Kaufman as 'Slick' Morrisey
- Roscoe Karns as Bertie
- Guy Tiney as Fat Boy
- Charles Haefeli as Johnny Regan
- Tom Kennedy as Battling Grogan
- James Quinn as Slim Dawson

== Preservation ==
With no holdings located in archives, Afraid to Fight is considered a lost film.
