= Child of Mine =

- Genre: Thriller
- Written by: Caleb Ranson
- Directed by: Jamie Payne
- Starring: Joanne Whalley; Adrian Dunbar; Hannah Lochner; Stevie Gillespie; Stacey Zurburg; Travis McConnell; Sylvia Syms; Barry Flatman
- Composer: Nick Bicât
- Country of origin: United Kingdom
- Original language: English
- No. of episodes: 1

Production
- Executive producers: Jane Featherstone; Jörg Westerkamp
- Producer: Alison Jackson
- Cinematography: Jeremy Hiles
- Editor: Nick Arthurs
- Running time: 120 minutes
- Production company: Kudos

Original release
- Network: ITV
- Release: 13 November 2005

Child of Mine is a British television drama thriller, written by Caleb Ranson and directed by Jamie Payne, that first broadcast on ITV on 13 November 2005.

Child of Mine attracted 6.25 million viewers on its debut broadcast. Child of Mine was released on Region 1 DVD in the United States on 8 September 2006 via Koch Vision.

== Plot ==
London couple Tess and Alfie Palmer cannot have their own children. They adopt two girls who are orphans from a Canadian, non-state-recognised placement agency. The mother of the children was murdered two years ago. Four-year-old Grace looks carefree, bright and fun-loving, whereas ten-year-old Heather is more depressed and serious. As time goes on, Heather proves stubborn and even violent. But adoptive mother Tess does not despair, as her training as a child psychologist leads her to believe that Heather appears to have a secret. Therapy talks with a colleague bring no progress, so she decides on a daring venture - a return to the scene of the crime in the hope of getting Heather to talk. She now considers it a possibility that Heather could have murdered her own mother.

Tess travels to Canada with Heather, and decides they should visit the empty house of Heather's mother, which proves very uncomfortable for Heather. Nevertheless, she begins to describe the scene with tears to Tess. During the subsequent short visit to the adoption agency, Heather recognises the culprit by means of a gesture. It is the owner of the agency, Alvin. Meanwhile, in an unattended moment, Tess rummages through a number of files. Astonishingly, each file consistently includes the note that the parent of the child being mediated is dead. Tess becomes suspicious. When the police sheriff arrives to interview him, Alvin shoots him dead. He also wants to eliminate Tess and Heather as witnesses. But Tess proves defensive, using the weapon used to kill the sheriff to injure Alvin and put him out of action, allowing her and Heather to escape.

== Cast ==
- Joanne Whalley as Tess Palmer
- Adrian Dunbar as Alfie Palmer
- Hannah Lochner as Heather McGill
- Stevie Gillespie as Grace McGill
- Stacey Zurburg as Jane McGill
- Travis McConnell as Stf. Sgt. Pyro
- Sylvia Syms as Alice Palmer
- Barry Flatman as Alvin
- Eve Crawford as Nora
- Don S. Davis as Pol. Ch. Hartman
- Shaun Dooley as Simon
- Sam Friend as Charlie
- Christianne Hirt as Denise
- Clare Holman as Karen

== Reception ==
Both the Lexicon of International Film and Prisma praised the convincing play by Hannah Lochner, commenting; "In addition to Joanne Whalley in the role of the new mother, Hannah Lochner in the role of Heather is especially convincing. With her expressive yet sensitive game, she steals the show off Whalley in every scene they perform together."

Prism added; "Unobtrusive but solid staged crime drama, played convincingly especially in the role of the older daughter." Hannah Lochner was nominated for Best Performance in an International Feature Film - Leading Young Performer at the 27th Young Artist Award for her role as Heather McGill.
