= Hannah Lochner =

Canadian actress (born 1993)

- Born: July 28, 1993 (age 32); London, Ontario, Canada
- Occupation: Actress
- Years active: 1997–present

Hannah Lochner (born July 28, 1993) is a Canadian actress.

== Career ==
Lochner has appeared in number of television series and made for-TV movies, including Life with Derek, Wild Card. She may be best known for her opening scene as Vivian in the 2004 film Dawn of the Dead. She later starred on Wingin' It (2010–12).

Lochner graduated from Etobicoke School of the Arts in 2011.

== Filmography ==
Film
Year	Title	Role	Notes
2000	Hold-Up	Little Girl	Short film
2003	Behind the Red Door	Young Natalie	
2004	Dawn of the Dead	Vivian	
2006	Harm's Way	Victoria	
2007	Firehouse Dog	Jasmine 'J.J.' Presley	
2008	The Devil's Mercy	Kayla	
2008	Jack and Jill vs. the World	Holly	

Television
Year	Title	Role	Notes
1997	Exhibit A: Secrets of Forensic Science	Daltons Daughter	Episode: "Exhibit A: Secrets of Forensic Science"
1998	Traders	Elizabeth Baker	Episode: "Blood on the Floor"
1999	Real Kids, Real Adventures	Melissa Preston	Episode: "Heimlich Hero: The Michelle Shreffler Story"
1999	La Femme Nikita	Little Nikita (uncredited)	Episode: "Imitation of Death"
1999	Must Be Santa	Angel	TV movie
2000	Angels in the Infield	Young Laurel	TV movie
2001	Sanctuary	Jo Ellen at age 7	TV movie
2002	Doc	Amanda Wellington	Episode: "My Boyfriend's Back"
2002	Torso: The Evelyn Dick Story	Heather Dick	TV movie
2002	All Around the Town	Young Laurie Kinmount	TV movie
2002	Terminal Invasion	Hannah	TV movie
2002	Body & Soul	Tess Foley	Episode: "Saviors"
2002	The Interrogation of Michael Crowe	Shannon Crowe	TV movie
2002	Salem Witch Trials	Dorcas Good	TV movie
2003	The Pentagon Papers	Young Mary Ellsberg	TV movie
2003	Encrypt	Mandy	TV movie
2003	Wild Card	Young Zoe	Episode: "Pilot"
2003	The Elizabeth Smart Story	Mary Katherine Smart	TV movie
2005	Child of Mine	Heather McGill	TV movie
2005-2006	G-Spot	Sasha	12 episodes
2007	In God's Country	Alice	TV movie
2007	The Gathering	Sarah	TV miniseries
2007	Life with Derek	Michelle	Episode: "It's Our Party"; Episode: "Power Failure"
2008	Life with Derek	Michelle	Episode: "Derek's School of Dating"
2008	The Latest Buzz	Caitlin	Episode: "The Peer Pressure Issue"
2010-2013	Wingin' It	Brittany Hanson	Recurring role
