= Encrypt (film) =

Encrypt

- Screenplay by: Richard Taylor; Robinson Young
- Story by: Richard Taylor
- Directed by: Oscar Luis Costo
- Starring: Grant Show; Vivian Wu; Steve Bacic
- Country of origin: United States

Production
- Producer: Derek Rappaport
- Cinematography: Michael Galbraith
- Editor: Andrew Cohen

Original release
- Network: Sci-Fi Channel
- Release: June 14, 2003

Encrypt is a television movie that premiered June 14, 2003 on the Sci-Fi Channel. Set in the year 2068, the Earth's surface is in a cataclysmic upheaval, much of it transformed into wasteland by unstoppable storms (the byproduct of the destruction of the ozone layer). It was directed by Oscar Luis Costo.

== Plot ==
A few survivors have dedicated themselves to preserving and protecting what is left of mankind; among these is former Army Captain John Thomas Garth. Approached by Lapierre, a former comrade now employed by eco-profiteer Anton Reich, Garth is made an offer he cannot refuse. In exchange for his father's and other's survival, Reich agrees to lead a small team of mercenaries into the impenetrable Vincent estate to "liberate" the priceless works of art that had been stored there. Accompanied by reconnaissance specialist Fernandez, sniper King, and tech genius Ebershaw, Garth must find a way to circumvent Encrypt, the deadly computerized security system surrounding the estate. Other obstacles include the Rook, a killer robot, and Diana, the holographic security chief of the estate. With the help of Lapierre, Garth destroys the Rook and discovers that it actually protects a device that can restore the ozone layer. With the help of Diana, Garth triggers it, but presumably dies soon afterwards.

== Cast ==
- Grant Show as John Garth
- Vivian Wu as Diana
- Steve Bacic as LaPierre
- Matthew G. Taylor as King
- Naomi Gaskin as Hernandez
- Wayne Ward as Ebershaw
- Art Hindle as Anton Reich
- Hannah Lochner as Mandy
- Vickie Papavs as Mandy's Mom
- Martin O'Carrigan as Garth's Dad
- Carolyn Goff as Elaine, Garth's Wife
