= A Quiet Street =

1922 film

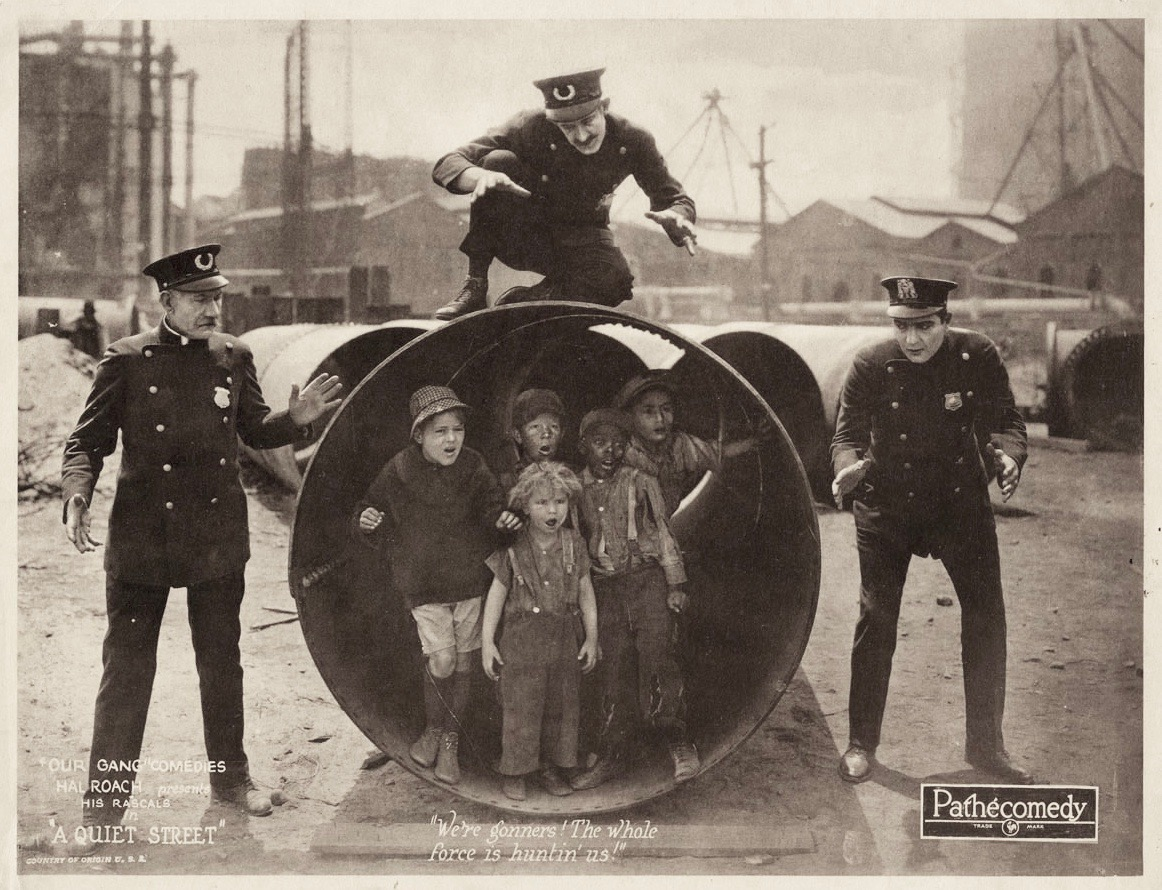
- Directed by: Tom McNamara; Robert F. McGowan
- Written by: Hal Roach; H. M. Walker
- Produced by: Charley Chase; Hal Roach
- Starring: Peggy Cartwright; Jackie Condon; Mickey Daniels; Jack Davis; Mary Kornman; Ernie Morrison; William Gillespie; Ernie Morrison Sr. Dick Gilbert; Clara Guiol; Jack Hill; Charles Stevenson
- Production company: Hal Roach Studios
- Release date: December 31, 1922
- Running time: 20 minutes
- Country: United States
- Languages: Silent film English intertitles

A Quiet Street is the sixth Our Gang short subject comedy to be released. The Our Gang series (later known as "The Little Rascals") was created by Hal Roach in 1922, and continued production until 1944.

== Synopsis ==
A new kid moves into town and is soon bullying little Jackie. When the gang finds this out, they beat up on the kid, only to discover that his father is a cop. Meanwhile, the police are after a criminal named Red Mike, and the gang mistakenly thinks they are the ones being chased.

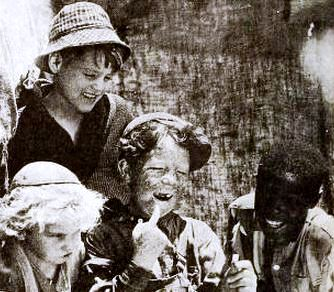
The gang chats in A Quiet Street.

== Cast ==
=== The Gang ===
- Jackie Condon as Jackie
- Mickey Daniels as Mickey
- Jack Davis as Jack
- Ernie Morrison as Booker T.

=== Additional cast ===
- Gabe Saienz as Banty, the new kid
- Peggy Cartwright as Banty's sister
- Dick Gilbert as Mugging victim/Police officer
- William Gillespie as Police dispatcher
- Clara Guiol as Banty's mother
- Jack Hill as Red Mike
- Joseph Morrison as Booker T.'s father
- Charles Stevenson as Banty's father, the police officer
- Dinah the Mule as Herself, Booker T.'s mule

== Notes ==
This is the last film with Peggy Cartwright.
