= Tom McNamara (director) =

American film director, writer, cartoonist

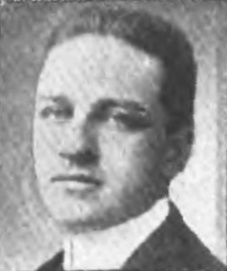
- McNamara in 1916
- Born: May 7, 1886
- Died: May 19, 1964 (aged 78); San Francisco, California
- Notable work: A Quiet Street; The Cobbler; Boys to Board

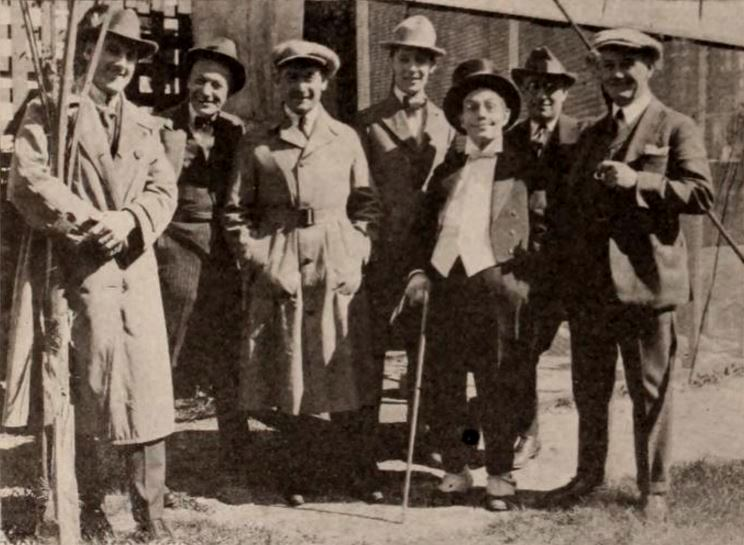
On the Christie Film Company lot, McNamara second from the right

Tom McNamara (May 7, 1886 – May 19, 1964) was an American film director, screenwriter and cartoonist from the 1910s to the 1940s. He is perhaps best known for his involvement as a director of several Our Gang shorts for the Hal Roach studio, and as the creator of the comic strip Us Boys in William Randolph Hearst's New York Journal.

McNamara died in San Francisco on May 19, 1964.

== Partial filmography ==
- The Gilded Lily (1921) (titles)
- The Idol of the North (1921) (titles)
- One Terrible Day (1922)
- Fire Fighters (1922)
- Young Sherlocks (1922)
- Saturday Morning (1922)
- A Quiet Street (1922)
- The Cobbler (1923)
- A Pleasant Journey (1923) (titles)
- Boys to Board (1923) (story, titles)
- Sparrows (1926) (uncredited)
- Little Orphan Annie (1932) (writer)
