= The Poor Boob =

1919 film by Donald Crisp

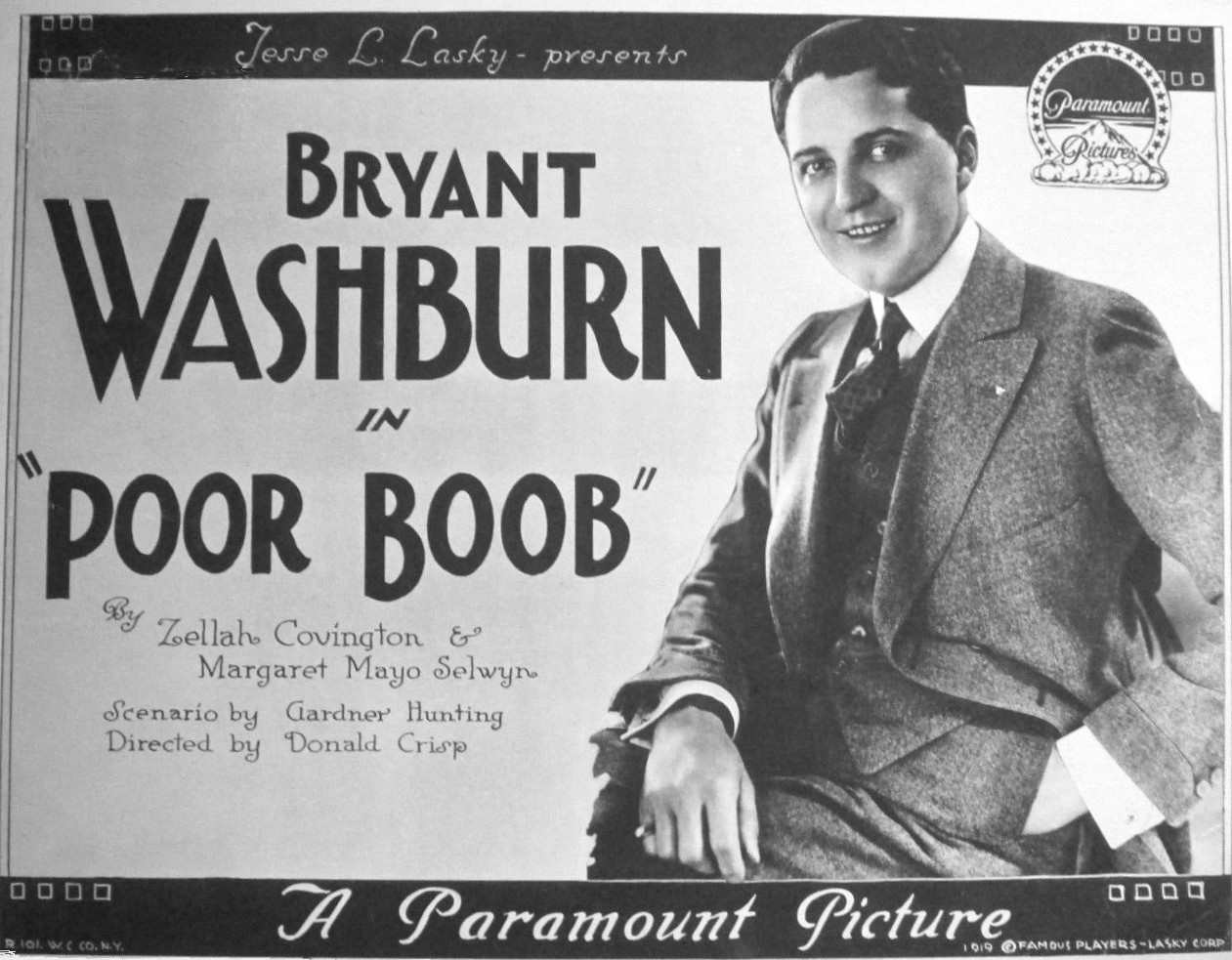
- Lobby card
- Directed by: Donald Crisp
- Screenplay by: Margaret Mayo; Z. Wall Covington; Gardner Hunting
- Starring: Bryant Washburn; Wanda Hawley; Richard Rosson; Theodore Roberts; Raymond Hatton; Jay Dwiggins
- Cinematography: Frank E. Garbutt
- Production company: Famous Players–Lasky Corporation
- Distributed by: Paramount Pictures
- Release date: March 9, 1919
- Running time: 50 minutes
- Country: United States
- Language: Silent (English intertitles)

The Poor Boob is a lost 1919 American silent comedy film directed by Donald Crisp and produced by Paramount Pictures. It starred Bryant Washburn, Wanda Hawley, Richard Rosson, Theodore Roberts, Raymond Hatton, and Jay Dwiggins.

== Plot ==
As described in a film magazine, Simpson Hightower, known as Simp, leaves his hometown as a failure. He has been cheated out of the local canning factory, which had been in the family for two generations, by Stephen Douglas. Douglas also won Tiny, the girl of Simp's dreams. Simp goes to New York and works at Platt's Provision Factory, and holds the job for a considerable time until he makes a bonehead mistake and gets fired. Henry Platt's stenographer, Hope, who has become fond of Simp, concocts a scheme to reestablish Simp by his posing as a millionaire in a nearby town with her as his secretary and Jimmy Borden, the office boy, as his valet. Simp decides to go Hightower, his hometown. The town makes great preparations for the return of its successful son, and Simp arrives and is greeted by its prominent citizens. With his luck turning, he closes a contract for Platt, his old employer, with a commission of $5,000. Douglas, who let the canning factory go to pieces, is willing to sell out for that amount. Simp buys the place and is immediately approached by Platt, who has received word that his factory has burned down. Since he cannot fulfill the contract, Platt demands return of the $5,000. But Simp takes over the contract, borrows some money from the town banker, and is well on the way to his fortune. As his boyhood sweetheart Tiny now weights two hundred pounds, his youthful illusion has faded and he begins to look to Hope with the eyes of love.

== Cast ==
- Bryant Washburn as Simpson Hightower
- Wanda Hawley as Hope 'Pep' Sparks
- Richard Rosson as Jimmy Borden
- Theodore Roberts as Henry Platt
- Raymond Hatton as Stephen Douglas
- Jay Dwiggins as Benton
- Charles Ogle as Tucker
- Jane Wolfe as Mrs. Benton
- Mary Thurman as Tiny Parcel
- Guy Oliver as Hallock
- Clarence Geldart as Mr. Swanson
