= Fire Fighters (film) =

1922 U.S. silent black-and-white short-subject "Our Gang"/"Little Rascals" comedy film

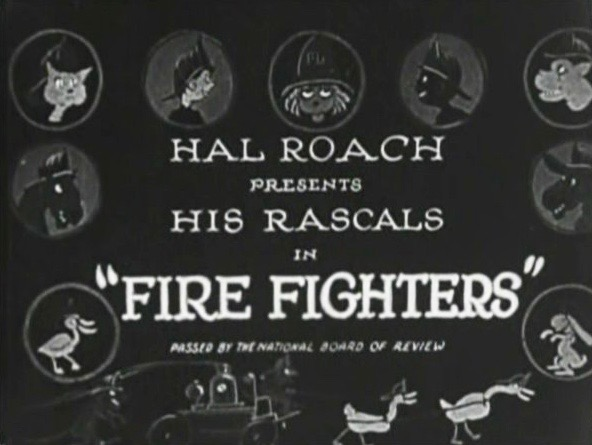
- Directed by: Charley Chase; Robert F. McGowan; Tom McNamara
- Written by: Hal Roach; H. M. Walker; Tom McNamara; Robert A. McGowan
- Produced by: Hal Roach
- Starring: Jackie Condon; Allen Hoskins; Peggy Cartwright; Ernie Morrison; Charles Stevenson; Ernie Morrison Sr. George Rowe
- Distributed by: Pathé
- Release date: October 8, 1922
- Running time: 25:31
- Country: United States
- Languages: Silent film English intertitles

Fire Fighters is a silent short film, the second entry in Hal Roach's Our Gang (Little Rascals) series. Directed by Robert F. McGowan and Tom McNamara, the two-reel short was released to theaters in October 1922 by Pathé.

== Plot ==
The kids organize their own fire department and unwittingly thwart a group of bootleggers.

== Production notes ==
- There are a total of ten children in the fire department: two girls and seven boys. There are three regular actors — Ernie Morrison, Allen Hoskins and Jackie Condon —and one regular actress, Peggy Cartwright. There are also four additional boys and one other girl. There is some conflict concerning the identity of these last five child actors and actress.
- This Our Gang entry marks the debut of Allen Hoskins, who portrayed the character "Farina" until 1931, making him the longest tenured member of the gang.
- Plot elements of Fire Fighters were reused in The Fourth Alarm (1926) and Hook and Ladder (1932).
- When television rights for the original silent Pathé Our Gang comedies were sold to National Telepix and other distributors, several episodes were retitled. This film was released as The Mischief Makers in 1960 under the title Little Firemen: two-thirds of the original film was included. The film was also released as an episode of the series Those Lovable Scallawags With Their Gangs under the title Fire Works. Among the scenes deleted were the opening animal sequences; most of the inter-titles were left intact.

== Cast ==
=== The Gang ===
- Ernie Morrison as Booker T. Bacon
- Jackie Condon as Roosevelt "Roosie" Pershing Smith
- Peggy Cartwright as Peggy
- George "Freckles" Warde as Freckles
- Richard Billings as Jackie's older brother
- Elmo Billings as Our Gang member
- Kenneth Johnson as Other Our Gang member
- Betsy Ann Hisle as Mabel 'Mike'
- Dinah the Mule as Lilly

=== Additional cast ===
- Allen Hoskins as Farina
- Joseph Morrison as Booker T.'s dad
- George Rowe as The bootlegger
- Charles Stevenson as The police officer

== See also ==
- Our Gang filmography
