= Young Sherlocks =

1922 film

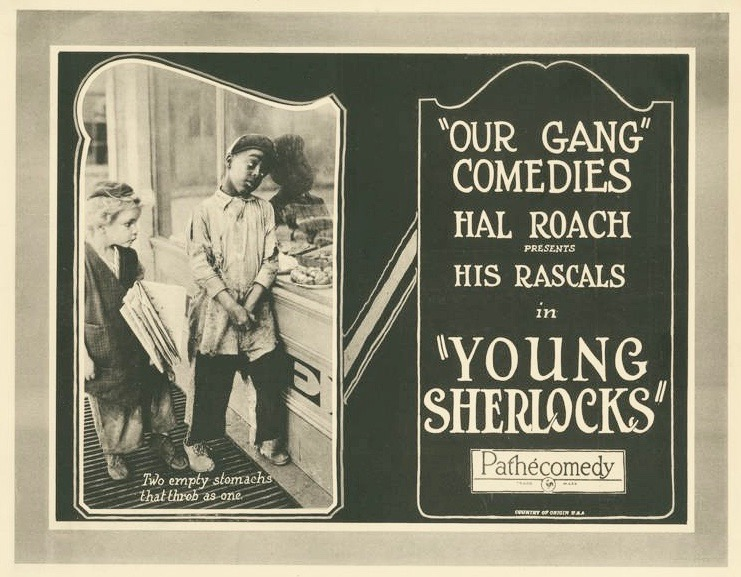
- Directed by: Charley Chase; Robert F. McGowan; Tom McNamara
- Written by: Hal Roach; H. M. Walker
- Produced by: Hal Roach
- Starring: Jackie Condon; Allen Hoskins; Peggy Cartwright; Mickey Daniels; Jack Davis; Ernest Morrison
- Distributed by: Pathé
- Release date: November 26, 1922
- Running time: 20 minutes
- Country: United States
- Language: Silent (English intertitles)

Young Sherlocks is a 1922 American silent short subject comedy film, the fourth entry in Hal Roach's Our Gang series. Directed by Robert F. McGowan and Tom McNamara, the two-reel short was released to theaters in November 1922 by Pathé.

== Plot ==
Young Sherlocks (1922)

Ernie uses his ingenuity to overcome his poverty and find a way to feed his little sister Farina and his steed, Dinah the mule. He encounters Jackie, who is selling newspapers, and learns about a kidnapper who is at large. Ernie then stumbles into a secret meeting of several young boys, including Mickey Daniels and Jack Davis, who call themselves the JJJs (Jesse James Juniors). They tell him that he is unwelcome in their meeting unless he can tell them what good deed he has ever done. He responds by spinning a long, and very unbelievable, tall tale of how he, Jackie, and Dinah rescued Peggy from the kidnappers. At the end of his story he claims that he used his reward money to buy a whole town, name it Free Town, and make himself Mayor and Jackie the Chief of Police. It is a beautiful town where all the children have plenty to eat, have nice clothes, and can have all the cake and candy they want. The story, and the film, ends with reality as Ernie’s mother finds him and hauls him and Farina back home.

== Notes ==
- William Gillespie and Dick Gilbert both play dual roles in this film.
- When the television rights for the original silent Pathé Our Gang comedies were sold to National Telepix and other distributors, several episodes were retitled. This film was released into television syndication as "Mischief Makers" in 1960 under the title Little Heroes. About two-thirds of the original film was included.
- The film was also released as an episode of the television series "Those Lovable Scallawags With Their Gangs" under the title Young Sherlock (no plural). Among the scenes cut from the latter TV print were most of the opening sequence with Sunshine Sammy and Farina; most of the inter-titles were left intact.

== Cast ==
=== The Gang ===
- Peggy Cartwright as Mary Jane
- Jackie Condon as Jackie a.k.a. Mickey
- Allen Hoskins as Farina
- Ernie Morrison as Ernie
- Dinah the Mule as herself

=== Additional Cast ===
- Mickey Daniels as JJJ Member
- Jack Davis as JJJ Member
- Gabe Saienz as JJJ Member
- Dot Farley as Mary Jane's mother
- Dick Gilbert as A kidnapper / The motorist
- William Gillespie as A kidnapper / The police officer
- Florence Hoskins as Ernie and Farina's mother
- Wallace Howe as A kidnapper
- Mark Jones as A kidnapper
- Joseph Morrison as A bank employee
- George Rowe as The Baker
- Charles Stevenson as Giovanna de Bullochi
- Charley Young as Mary Jane's father
