= Noah Cappe =

Canadian actor and television host

- Born: December 27, 1977 (age 48); Toronto, Ontario, Canada
- Occupations: Actor, TV Host
- Years active: 1997–Present
- Spouse: Keri West
- Children: 1

Noah Cappe (born December 27, 1977) is a Canadian actor and television host best known for his work on Good Witch, Carnival Eats, and The Bachelorette Canada.

== Career ==
Cappe's most notable acting role is that of Derek Sanders, a role that he began in a series of The Good Witch TV movies before reprising the role on the television series. In 2007, he appeared in the winning video for Matthew Good's song "Born Losers".

Cappe's most notable hosting positions are on the Food Network's Carnival Eats, and the W Network's The Bachelorette Canada, a job he received thanks in part to a tweet he made expressing his excitement for the upcoming show and asking if they needed a host.

== Personal life ==
Cappe is one of 8 children. At the age of 23, Cappe went on a trip to Israel where he met then 19-year-old Keri West. They formed a relationship after discovering they lived a short distance apart in Toronto. In front of an audience at Frontier College, Cappe proposed to Keri in 2014 with a ring made from her grandparents' jewelry. In 2017, they legally married at city hall after having previous celebrations with family. The couple pursued adopting a child since the year 2017, and welcomed a baby girl named Wolfie in 2021.

== Filmography ==
=== Film ===
Year	Film	Role	Notes	Ref
1997	Ursa Major	Ralphie Gorch	Short film	
2002	Rub & Tug	Teenager client		
2005	On That Day	Daniel	Short film	
2009	Chaseism	Chasist	Short film	
2014	Ruby Skye P.I.: The Maltese Puppy	Det. Von Schlagen		
2015	How to Plan an Orgy in a Small Town	Otis		

=== Television ===
Year	Series	Role	Notes	Ref
1997–1999	Exhibit A: Secrets of Forensic Science	Border Guard / Martin Miller	2 episodes	
1999	Real Kids, Real Adventures	Jubal Goodner	Episode: "Paralyzed: The Eli Goodner Story"	
2001	The Zack Files	Moderator	2 episodes	
2002	The 5th Quadrant	Nosferata/Principal	2 episodes	
2004	6teen	Kyle	Voice; Episode: "The Sushi Connection"; Uncredited	
2006	Z-Squad	Prince Aramis	Voice; Episode: Pilot	
2006–2008	Di-Gata Defenders	Seth	52 episodes	
2009	The Good Witch's Garden	Derek Sanders	TV movie	
2009	Degrassi: The Next Generation	Security Guard	Episode: "Jane Says: Part 1"	
2009	Wild Roses	Steve	Episode: "Hunters and Gatherers"	
2009	Pearlie		Voice; Episode: "Ant Misbehavin'/Frilled Neck & Neck"	
2009–2010	The Dating Guy	Bryce	Voice, 10 episodes	
2009–2010	Being Erica	Michael	2 episodes	
2010	The Good Witch's Gift	Derek Sanders	TV movie	
2011	Breakout Kings	Bob LaFontaine	Episode: "ike Father, Like Son"	
2011	The Good Witch's Family	Derek Sanders	TV movie	
2011	Rookie Blue	Martin	Episode: "Monster"	
2011	Nikita	Dale	Episode: "343 Walnut Lane"	
2011	Warehouse 13	Uggo the Ghoul	Voice, 6 episodes	
2012	The Good Witch's Charm	Derek Sanders	TV movie	
2012	Transporter: The Series	Ogilvey	Episode: "12 Hours"	
2012	Baby's First Christmas	Jim Pendrell	TV movie	
2013	The Good Witch's Destiny	Derek Sanders	TV movie	
2014	Defiance	Blademaker Barth	Episode: "The Opposite of Hallelujah"	
2014	The Good Witch's Wonder	Derek Sanders	TV movie	
2014	Bitten	Travis	4 episodes	
2014–2023	Carnival Eats	Himself/host	127 episodes	
2015	The Great Canadian Cookbook	Himself / co-host	Nominated – Canadian Screen Award for Best Host in a Lifestyle, Talk or Entertainment News Program or Series (2017)	
2015–2017	Good Witch	Derek Sanders	19 episodes	
2016–2017	The Bachelorette Canada	Himself	Host, 10 episodes	
2018	Iron Chef Canada	Himself	Judge; Season 1 episode 1: "Battle Maple"	
2020–present	Wall of Chefs	Himself/host	5 episodes	
2019	Power Rangers Beast Morphers	Cruise	Voice	
2024	“Best Bite In Town”	Self/Host		

=== Video games ===
Year	Title	Role	Notes	Ref
2013	Defiance	Barth	Voice	

=== Music videos ===
Year	Song	Artist	Role
2007	Born Losers	Matthew Good	Lead man
