= The Good Witch =

2008 Canadian film

- Written by: Rod Spence
- Directed by: Craig Pryce
- Starring: Catherine Bell; Chris Potter; Catherine Disher; Peter MacNeill; Allan Royal; Matthew Knight; Paula Boudreau; Hannah Endicott-Douglas
- Composer: Jack Lenz
- Countries of origin: Canada; United States
- Original language: English

Production
- Executive producers: Orly Adelson; Frank Siracusa
- Producer: Ian McDougall
- Cinematography: Gerald Packer
- Editor: George Roulston
- Running time: 89 minutes
- Production companies: Whizbang Films; Lee Distribution

Original release
- Network: Hallmark Channel
- Release: January 19, 2008

Related
- The Good Witch's Garden; Good Witch

The Good Witch is a television film that aired on the Hallmark Channel on January 19, 2008. It stars Catherine Bell as Cassandra "Cassie" Nightingale and Chris Potter as chief of police Jake Russell. The film has spawned a franchise of six followup television films and the television series Good Witch.

== Plot ==
The town of Middleton is shaken up by the arrival of the mysterious, beautiful Cassandra, "Cassie" Nightingale, who has moved into Grey House—an old, abandoned building supposedly haunted by its former owner and Cassie's ancestor Elizabeth Merriwick, known as "The Grey Lady". Martha Tinsdale, wife of the town's mayor, demands that Police Chief Jake Russell investigate reports of a woman occupying the house; together, they meet Cassie, who answers questions evasively but makes clear she is the home's owner and resident.

Later, a dog named Attila chases Jake's children, Brandon and Lori, on their way home from school. They end up at Grey House, where Lori falls and scrapes her knee. Cassie appears and the dog leaves in response to her verbal admonishment. Cassie invites the children inside and tends to Lori's knee with an herbal poultice. Attila's owner Rusty complains to Jake that his guard dog has become completely docile, so Jake meets with Cassie, quickly establishing that the entire incident occurred on Cassie's property, negating Rusty's complaint. Jake is surprised to learn that she has met his children. Cassie invites him to visit her at Grey House or the shop she plans to open on Main Street.

Jake's wife died three years earlier; Brandon has become surly and withdrawn, while Lori has nightmares. Lori asks Cassie about stopping the nightmares; Cassie gives her a dreamcatcher and uses reverse psychology to get her to dream about bunnies instead. Meanwhile, Brandon's classmate Kyle has been threatening Brandon and demanding his lunch money

Cassie opens her shop, "Bell, Book, & Candle", specializing in herbs and curiosities. She sells an aphrodisiac essential oil to a woman named Nancy; she and her husband have experienced infertility, but later she successfully conceives. Meanwhile the Mayor's busybody wife believes Cassie's wares are associated with witchcraft. After Martha falls over a display while recoiling from the merchandise, she accuses Cassie of assault. When Jake goes to see Cassie, he learns she has hired Walter Cobb, a homeless alcoholic, to assist in renovations while living onsite. Jake declines to file charges, concluding Martha's fall was accidental, displeasing Martha's husband, Mayor Tom Tinsdale, who demands Jake run a background check on Cassie. After Jake finds no record of a "Cassandra Nightingale", she admits to him that she ran away from foster care after her parents died in a car crash. He asks her to dinner and she accepts.

Brandon and Lori are now convinced Cassie is a "good witch" who can perform magic. Brandon asks Cassie for help with Kyle, and she agrees to turn him into "something less threatening", but sets conditions that require Brandon to spend time with Kyle. Brandon learns Kyle steals money to placate his abusive father; he confides the situation to Jake, who welcomes Kyle when Brandon brings him round to play video games. Jake's father-in-law, George, introduces himself to Cassie due to her increasing involvement with his family. She quickly befriends him and convinces him to fulfil his lifelong ambition of visiting his ancestral homeland of Ireland.

Martha rouses a group of townspeople against Cassie for her supposed practice of "dark arts" and her association with Walter Cobb. She gathers signatures to revoke Cassie's business license and Cassie cancels the dinner to avoid any conflict of interest for Jake. But at George's urging, Jake goes to see her and finds she has already prepared an intimate dinner for them to enjoy at Grey House. She reveals her given name, "Sue Ellen Brock", and Jake acknowledges that her chosen name suits her better.

Cassie hosts a Halloween party, but most of the townspeople force their children to stay away. Jake's family attend, as do Walter, Nancy and her husband, and Kyle. Cassie believes Martha will succeed in driving her out of town, but Jake urges her to change her defeatist mindset of "running away". Jake's deputy, Derrick, catches Martha's sons Michael and Dylan vandalizing Cassie's shop. Cassie refuses to press charges and Tom demands Martha drop her destructive vendetta, also ordering his sons to work off their debt to Cassie. As Jake too helps Cassie clear up, he teases her over a broomstick that inexplicably appears in the shop.

== Cast and characters ==
- Catherine Bell as Cassandra "Cassie" Nightingale.
- Chris Potter as Chief of Police Jake Russell.
- Catherine Disher as Martha Tinsdale, wife of the mayor.
- Peter MacNeill as George O'Hanrahan, Brandon and Lori's maternal grandfather and father-in-law of Jake.
- Allan Royal as Walter Cobb
- Matthew Knight as Brandon Russell, Jake's son.
- Hannah Endicott-Douglas as Lori Russell, Jake's youngest child.
- Paula Boudreau as Nancy, a city council member.
- Jesse Bostick as the bully Kyle,
- Noah Cappe as Deputy Derek Sanders.
- Paul Miller as Tom Tinsdale, Mayor of Middleton.
- Nathan McLeod as Michael, son of Martha and Tom Tinsdale.

== Production ==
Although set in Middleton, USA, it was filmed in Hamilton, Cambridge and Niagara-on-the-Lake, in Ontario, Canada. In the sequel, The Good Witch's Charm, the map on the wall in the police station shows Middleton located northwest of Chicago, in the vicinity of DeKalb County. The names of the suburbs and interstates that are northwest of Chicago can be clearly seen.

In S2E8 of the original series, Sam’s friend Doug refers to Middleton as “up this far North of Chicago.”

== Promotion and release ==
On January 15, 2008, Hallmark Channel and Limbo, the mobile entertainment community, teamed up to create and launch the cable network's first-ever mobile interactive initiative. The campaign "enhanced viewers' experience of the premiere of the network's original movie ... through 'Limbo Unique' – a game played via cell phone or online". The grand prize was $2,000 and a portrait of the "Grey Lady" that was featured in the movie.

== Home media ==
The Good Witch (Region 1) DVD was released on January 5, 2010. The Good Witch Collection (Region 1) DVD was released October 14, 2014.

== Reception ==
The movie had great success on Hallmark Channel on the night of its premiere, making it the second-highest-rated original movie to that date. It premiered with a 3.8 HH (household) rating and was in nearly 3.2 million homes. It also was #1 in its time period, propelling the channel to the #4 spot in weekly ranking.

== Film series ==
In addition to the original television movie, the Hallmark Channel has aired six followup television films.

No.	Title	Directed by	Written by	Original release date
1	"The Good Witch"	Craig Pryce	Rod Spence	January 19, 2008
2	"The Good Witch's Garden"	Craig Pryce	G. Ross Parker, Rod Spence	February 7, 2009
3	"The Good Witch's Gift"	Craig Pryce	G. Ross Parker, Rod Spence	November 13, 2010
4	"The Good Witch's Family"	Craig Pryce	G. Ross Parker, Rod Spence	October 29, 2011
5	"The Good Witch's Charm"	Craig Pryce	G. Ross Parker, Rod Spence	October 27, 2012
6	"The Good Witch's Destiny"	Craig Pryce	Annie Young Frisbie, Rod Spence	October 26, 2013
7	"The Good Witch's Wonder"	Craig Pryce	Rod Spence	October 25, 2014

== Television series ==
In February 2014, the Hallmark Channel announced that Good Witch had been green-lighted for a ten-episode series, starring Catherine Bell, to premiere on February 28, 2015. Production for the first season began on October 29, 2014, in Toronto, with Sue Tenney as showrunner. Bailee Madison and James Denton also star. The series ran for seven seasons, concluding on July 25, 2021.

== See also ==
- List of films about witchcraft
