= Chris Potter (actor) =

Canadian actor (born 1960)

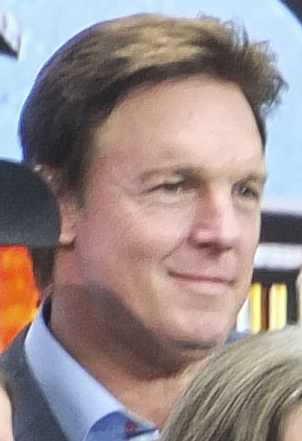
- Potter at the 2015 CBC Con
- Born: Christopher Jay Potter; August 23, 1960 (age 66); Toronto, Ontario, Canada
- Occupation: Actor
- Years active: 1988–present
- Spouse: Karen Potter (m. 1985)
- Children: 4

Christopher "Chris" Jay Potter (born August 23, 1960) is a Canadian actor. He is primarily known for his roles on soap operas and prime-time television. Potter is known for his roles as Peter Caine, the son of Kwai Chang Caine (played by David Carradine) on the 1990s crime drama Kung Fu: The Legend Continues, Sgt. Tom Ryan in Silk Stalkings, Dr. David Cameron on the first season of Queer as Folk, the voice of Gambit in the X-Men: The Animated Series, and for his recurring role as con artist Evan Owen on The Young and the Restless. His most prominent role is as Tim Fleming on the long-running Canadian drama Heartland. In 2008, Chris Potter began playing police chief Jake Russell in The Good Witch film franchise opposite Catherine Bell.

== Early life ==
The oldest of three children, Potter was born in Toronto, Ontario, to Ron Potter, an ex-pro-football player and insurance executive, and Judith Potter, a singer. Potter was raised in London, Ontario and attended Oakridge Secondary School. His mother was interested, and got her son involved, in community theater. He also developed an interest in sports and music.

Potter wanted a career as a professional athlete; however, his father would not permit it. He later quit college to start a career as a rock musician. He discovered a love for the theater and became a professional stage actor. He also worked on an oil rig in Northern Canada, sold cars, and later became an insurance salesman. He left the insurance company to start his career on TV, as an actor and a pitchman.

== Career ==
After being a spokesman on many commercials in the 1980s, and his role in Material World, he finally made his mark in TV playing David Carradine's son and crime-fighting partner, Det. Peter Caine on Kung Fu: The Legend Continues, after receiving a contract with Warner Bros. in 1992, and remained close friends with Carradine until his death in 2009. His first role, in 1993, was a hit in both Canada and United States. From 1996 to 1999, he starred in the crime drama Silk Stalkings as Sgt. Tom Ryan. He also provided the voice of Gambit for the first four seasons of X-Men: The Animated Series.

Potter was featured in Rocket's Red Glare (2000). He appeared on the first season as Dr. David Cameron on Queer as Folk opposite Hal Sparks, and he starred in a mini-series A Wrinkle in Time (2003) for ABC. He also co-starred with Joely Fisher in Wild Card from 2003 to 2005. Potter also appeared in Spymate (2006). He also played Graydon Jennings in the movie Thrill of The Kill.

The following year, he landed another role opposite Amber Marshall in the CBC Television series Heartland playing the role of Tim Fleming. Also in 2007, Potter joined the cast of The Young and the Restless in a recurring role as Evan Owen, playing opposite Judith Chapman, with whom he had previously appeared on an episode of Silk Stalkings; Potter remained on The Young and the Restless until being written out in early 2008.

From 2008 to 2014, Potter was opposite Catherine Bell in a series of seven TV movies featuring The Good Witch portraying Jake Russell. He was co-executive producer of The Good Witch's Charm, The Good Witch's Destiny and The Good Witch's Wonder, and his co-star Catherine Disher had previously worked with him on X-Men and Kung Fu: The Legend Continues. Potter was unable to continue the role on the television series because of scheduling conflicts with his work on Heartland.

== Personal life ==
Potter is married to Karen, and they have four children.

== Filmography ==
=== Films ===
- 2000: Spiders – Hero
- 2000: Rocket's Red Glare – Tom Young
- 2001: The Shrink Is In – Jonathon
- 2001: Arachnid – Lev Valentine
- 2004: Right Hook: A Tall Tail (Short) – Fisherman
- 2005: The Pacifier – Captain Bill Fawcett
- 2006: Spymate – Mike Muggins
- 2011: A Warrior's Heart – Seamus "Sully" Sullivan
- 2013: The Hunt (Short) – Bart

=== Television ===
Chris Potter television credits
Year	Title	Role	Notes
1988	War of the Worlds	Farmer	Episode: "The Walls of Jericho"
1989	Knightwatch	Tonnelli	Episode: "Cops: Part 2"
1989	Street Legal	Grant Simon	Episode: "Confession"
1989	Katts and Dog	Griff Lewis	Episode: "Fatal Obsession"
1990-1992	Top Cops	Various	6 episodes
1990-1992	Material World	Tim Lyons	Seasons 1-3
1992	Counterstrike	Billy	Episode: "The Three Tramps"
1992–1996	X-Men: The Animated Series	Remy LeBeau / Gambit (voice)	Regular role (5 seasons)
1993–1997	Kung Fu: The Legend Continues	Peter Caine	Main role (4 seasons)
1995	Spider-Man: The Animated Series	Remy LeBeau / Gambit (voice)	2 episodes
1996	The Nightmare Stepbrother	Adrian Williams	Television movie
1996–2000	Legends of Achilles	Achilles	Main role 96 episodes
1996–1999	Silk Stalkings	Detective Sergeant Tom Ryan	Main role (seasons 6–8)
1998	The Waiting Game	Adrian Seville	TV movie
1999	The Outer Limits	Captain Turner	Episode: "Stranded"
2000	Queer as Folk	Dr. David Cameron	Recurring role (season 1)
2000	Will & Grace	Michael	Episode: "Hey La, Hey La, My Ex-Boyfriend's Back"
2001	Final Jeopardy	Jed Seigel	TV movie
2001	Touched by an Angel	Michael Reilly	Episode: "Angels Anonymous"
2003	Andromeda	Able Ladrone	Episode: "The Right Horse"
2003	Rush of Fear	Sam Bryant	TV movie
2003	A Wrinkle in Time	Dr Jack Murry	TV movie
2003–2005	Wild Card aka Zoe Busiek: Wild Card	Dan Lennox	Co-lead
2004	Open House	David Morrow	TV movie
2004	Sex Traffic	Tom Harlsburgh	TV movie
2004–2006	Law & Order: Special Victims Unit	Mr. Rice / Linus KcKellen	2 episodes
2005	One Tree Hill	Ray Green	Episode: "I'm Wide Awake, It's Morning"
2005	Trump Unauthorized	Fred Trump Jr., adult	TV movie
2007	Superstorm	Dan Abrams	TV miniseries
2007	The Young and the Restless	Evan Owen	12 episodes
2007–present	Heartland	Tim Fleming	Main Cast
2008	The Good Witch	Jake Russell	TV movie
2009	The Good Witch's Garden	Jake Russell	TV movie
2010	The Good Witch's Gift	Jake Russell	TV movie
2010	A Heartland Christmas	Tim Fleming	TV movie
2011	The Good Witch's Family	Jake Russell	TV movie
2012	The Good Witch's Charm	Jake Russell	TV movie
2013	The Good Witch's Destiny	Jake Russell	TV movie
2014	The Good Witch's Wonder	Jake Russell	TV movie
2015	Angels in the Snow	Charles Montgomery	TV movie
2024–present	X-Men '97	Nathan Summers / Cable (voice)	Recurring role (season 1); Regular role (season 2)

=== Director ===
Heartland

- Episode #45: "The Happy List" - January 31, 2010
- Episode #64: "The River" - February 27, 2011
- Episode #65: "Never Surrender" - March 6, 2011
- Episode #98: "Waiting For Tomorrow" - February 10, 2013
- Episode #110: "Best Man" - November 17, 2013
- Episode #111: "Hotshot" - December 1, 2013
- Episode #128: "Walk a Mile" - November 9, 2014
- Episode #129: "The Family Tree" - November 23, 2014
- Episode #144: "Back in the Saddle" - November 1, 2015
- Episode #145: "Over and Out" - November 8, 2015
- Episode #164: "Riding Shotgun" - November 13, 2016
- Episode #165: "Here and Now" - November 20, 2016
- Episode #182: "Our Sons and Daughters" - November 12, 2017
- Episode #183: "Truth Be Told" - November 19, 2017
- Episode #194: "Dare to Dream" - January 6, 2019
- Episode #195: "Hearts Run Free" - January 13, 2019
- Episode #200: "Running Scared" - March 3, 2019
- Episode #211: "The Art of Trust" - November 3, 2019
- Episode #212: "Legacy" - November 10, 2019
- Episode #217: "Making Amends" - January 24, 2021

Silk Stalkings

- Episode #168: "It's The Great Pumpkin, Harry" - January 24, 1999
- Episode #160: "Hidden Agenda" - August 30, 1998
- Episode #154: "Genius" - April 19, 1998
