= Vivien Endicott-Douglas =

Canadian actress (born 1990)

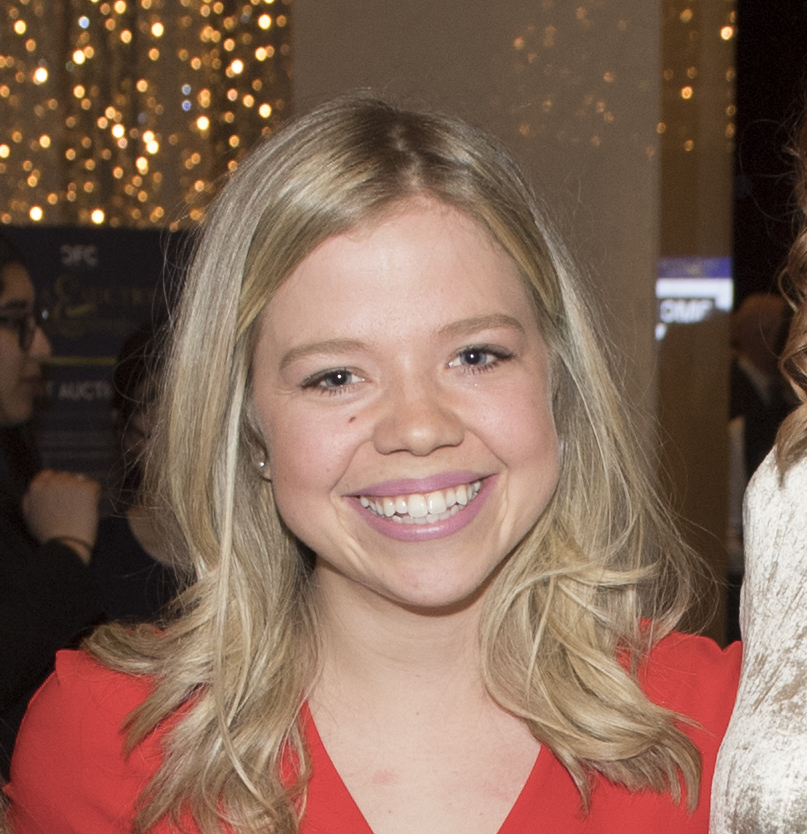
- Endicott-Douglas at the 2019 CFC Annual Gala & Auction
- Born: December 10, 1990 (age 35); Toronto, Ontario, Canada
- Occupation: Actress
- Years active: 2003–present
- Relatives: Hannah Endicott-Douglas (sister)

Vivien Endicott-Douglas (born December 10, 1990) is a Canadian actress.

== Early life ==
Endicott-Douglas was born in Toronto to Valerie and Stephen Endicott-Douglas. Her younger sister is fellow actress Hannah.

== Career ==
Endicott-Douglas is best-known for her role as Marnie in the television series Shoebox Zoo (2004–2005), when she was 13 years old. Her works include films such Finn on the Fly (2008) and the made-for-TV movie Terry (2005), based on the story of Canadian hero Terry Fox. Her performance in the indie film The Shape of Rex (2013) led to a nomination for ACTRA Outstanding Female Performance, and she was also nominated for the Dora Mavor Moore Award for Outstanding Performance by a Female for her role in the Rose Napoli play Lo (or Dear Mr. Wells) (2017).

== Filmography ==
Year	Title	Role	Notes
2003	Back to School with Franklin	Goose (voice)	Video
2004–2005	Shoebox Zoo	Marnie McBride	26 episodes
2005	Terry	Judy Fox	TV movie
2008	Finn on the Fly	Ashley	
2008	An Old Fashioned Thanksgiving	Prudence	TV movie
2008	Anne of Green Gables: A New Beginning	Violetta Thomas	TV movie
2009	The Line	Emma	5 episodes
2009	The Lesson	Sam	
2009	How Eunice Got Her Baby	Eunice	
2010	Rookie Blue	Samantha	Episode: "Honor Roll"
2010	Cra$h & Burn	Angie	Episode: "Closure"
2013	The Shape of Rex	young Rose	Nominated, ACTRA Outstanding Female Performance award Nominated, Best Lead Female, Madrid International Film Festival
2014	Left for Dead	Emily Walker	TV movie
2017	American Gods	Pizza Delivery Woman	Episode: "The Secret of Spoons"
2020	Clouds	Alli Sobiech	
2021	Defund	Karen	

== Stage performances ==
Year	Title	Theatre	Role	Notes
2011	Forests	Tarragon Theatre, Toronto	Loup	
2015	Harper Regan	Bluma Appel Theatre, Toronto	teenage daughter	
2016	Killer Joe	Coal Mine Theatre, Toronto	Dottie	
2017	Infinity	NAC English Theatre	Sarah Jean	
2017	Lo (or Dear Mr. Wells)	Crow's Theatre, Toronto	Laura	Nominated for the Dora Mavor Moore Award for Outstanding Performance by a Female in a Principal Role
2018	Category E	Coal Mine Theatre, Toronto	Millet	
2025	Enormity, Girl and the Earthquake in Her Lungs	Nightwood Theatre, Toronto	Vic	
2026	A Midsummer Nights Dream	Stratford Festival, Ontario	Hermia	
2026	Othello	Stratford Festival, Ontario	Bianca	
2026	The King James Bible Play	Stratford Festival, Ontario	Han	

== See also ==
- Hannah Endicott-Douglas
