= Jack Lenz =

Canadian composer

John Frederick "Jack" Lenz is a Canadian composer. He has written, performed, and produced music for film, television, and theatre, along with working on non-soundtrack album ventures. He is also the founder of Live Unity Enterprises, an organization devoted to the production of music for the Baháʼí community.

Lenz contributed additional music for the John Debney score for Mel Gibson's film The Passion of the Christ. Among his current projects is working on a movie about the persecution of Baháʼís in Iran, particularly the story of Mona Mahmudnizhad who suffered under the persecution in Iran, under the title of Mona's Dream. He was music director of 90 Minutes Live, with Peter Gzowski on CBC Television from 1976 to 1978.

He resides in Toronto, Ontario.

== Background ==
Lenz was born in Eston, Saskatchewan. His mother was also raised in Saskatchewan, and his father came to Canada from Hungary during the Depression. While still in his youth, Lenz took piano lessons from Garth Beckett and later studied composition at the University of Saskatchewan. Lenz became a professional musician when he played keyboards and flute for the soft-rock bands Seals and Crofts and Loggins and Messina touring around the world, performing before large audiences, and recording. Lenz' involvement in children's issues stems partly from having seven children of his own, as well as being in an arena which avoids "the conflict between what I believe about music and its sacred nature and dealing with what a lot of programming deals with, which sometimes could be the worst aspects of human nature." Lenz joined the Baháʼí Faith in 1969.

== Discography ==
=== Film ===
Year	Title	Notes
1985	Final Offer	TV movie
1994	To Catch a Yeti	TV movie
1995	Pocahontas: The Legend	—N/a
2004	The Passion of the Christ	—N/a
2008	The Good Witch	TV movie
2009	The Good Witch's Garden	TV movie
2010	The Good Witch's Gift	TV movie
2011	The Good Witch's Family	TV movie
2012	The Good Witch's Charm	TV movie
2013	The Good Witch's Destiny	TV movie
2014	The Good Witch's Wonder	TV movie
2014	Left Behind	—N/a

=== Television ===
Year	Title	Notes
1994-1999	Due South	63 episodes
1995-1998	Goosebumps	34 episodes
1999-2004	Nanalan'	Composer and executive producer
2001-2004	Doc	6 episodes
2003-2005	Sue Thomas: F.B.Eye	53 episodes
2003-2009	The Saddle Club	46 episodes
2004-2008	Atomic Betty	79 episodes
2007-2012	Little Mosque on the Prairie	88 episodes
2008-2009	Big & Small	21 episodes
2015-2021	Good Witch	73 episodes
2018-2019	Battle Dogs	Producer and composer, ten episodes

=== Albums ===
Year	Album/Song	Role	Notes
1977	Finale	Flutist	—N/a
1983	OK Blue Jays	Songwriter	—N/a
2004	Go Where Love Goes	Songwriter	Performed by Andrea Bocelli on Andrea

== Awards ==
=== Gemini Awards ===
Year	Category	Nominated work	Result
1995	Best Original Music Score for a Series	Due South, episode "Free Willie"	Nominated
1996	Best Original Music Score for a Dramatic Series	Due South, episode "The Gift of the Wheelman"	Nominated
2004	Best Pre-School Program or Series	Nanalan'	Nominated
