= Good Witch (franchise) =

Hallmark Channel media franchise

- Original work: Canada; United States
- Owner: Hallmark Channel
- Years: 2008–2021

Films and television
- Television series: Good Witch (2015–21)
- Television specials: 5 (list of specials)
- Television films: 7 (list of films)

Good Witch is a Hallmark Channel media franchise that is centered on a series of films and a television series. The franchise is centered upon Cassandra "Cassie" Nightingale (Catherine Bell), the titular "good witch" who uses her abilities to bring positive change in the lives of those around her.

The franchise was launched with the 2008 film The Good Witch, which aired on the Hallmark Channel on January 19, 2008. It has since been followed with six additional movies and a television series that has run for seven seasons.

== Cast ==
- A dark grey cell indicates the character was not in the film or the series season/special.

Character	Title																		
Character	The Good Witch	Garden	Gift	Family	Charm	Destiny	Wonder	Season 1	Halloween	Season 2	Secrets of Grey House	Season 3	Spellbound	Season 4	A Tale of Two Hearts	Season 5	Curse From A Rose	Season 6	Season 7
Cassie Nightingale	Catherine Bell	Catherine Bell	Catherine Bell	Catherine Bell	Catherine Bell	Catherine Bell	Catherine Bell	Catherine Bell	Catherine Bell	Catherine Bell	Catherine Bell	Catherine Bell	Catherine Bell	Catherine Bell	Catherine Bell	Catherine Bell	Catherine Bell	Catherine Bell	Catherine Bell
Jake Russell	Chris Potter	Chris Potter	Chris Potter	Chris Potter	Chris Potter	Chris Potter	Chris Potter												
Martha Tinsdale	Catherine Disher	Catherine Disher	Catherine Disher	Catherine Disher	Catherine Disher	Catherine Disher	Catherine Disher	Catherine Disher	Catherine Disher	Catherine Disher	Catherine Disher	Catherine Disher	Catherine Disher	Catherine Disher	Catherine Disher	Catherine Disher	Catherine Disher	Catherine Disher	Catherine Disher
George O'Hanrahan	Peter MacNeill	Peter MacNeill	Peter MacNeill		Peter MacNeill	Peter MacNeill	Peter MacNeill	Peter MacNeill	Peter MacNeill	Peter MacNeill	Peter MacNeill	Peter MacNeill	Peter MacNeill	Peter MacNeill	Peter MacNeill	Peter MacNeill	Peter MacNeill	Peter MacNeill	Peter MacNeill
Brandon Russell	Matthew Knight	Matthew Knight	Matthew Knight	Matthew Knight	Matthew Knight	Matthew Knight	Matthew Knight	Dan Jeannotte	Dan Jeannotte	Dan Jeannotte		Dan Jeannotte		Dan Jeannotte		Dan Jeannotte			
Lori Russell	Hannah Endicott-Douglas	Hannah Endicott-Douglas	Hannah Endicott-Douglas	Hannah Endicott-Douglas	Hannah Endicott-Douglas	Hannah Endicott-Douglas	Hannah Endicott-Douglas	Hannah Endicott-Douglas	Hannah Endicott-Douglas										
Derek Sanders	Noah Cappe	Noah Cappe	Noah Cappe	Noah Cappe	Noah Cappe	Noah Cappe	Noah Cappe	Noah Cappe	Noah Cappe	Noah Cappe	Noah Cappe	Noah Cappe							
Tom Tinsdale	Paul Miller	Paul Miller	Paul Miller	Paul Miller				Paul Miller		Paul Miller		Paul Miller		Paul Miller		Paul Miller	Paul Miller	Paul Miller	Paul Miller
Dylan Tinsdale	Alexander De Jordy																	JD Smith	JD Smith
Michael Tinsdale	Nathan McLeod									Edward Ruttle		Edward Ruttle							
Gwen		Elizabeth Lennie	Elizabeth Lennie		Elizabeth Lennie	Elizabeth Lennie													
Abigail Pershing				Sarah Power				Sarah Power	Sarah Power	Sarah Power	Sarah Power	Sarah Power	Sarah Power	Sarah Power	Sarah Power	Sarah Power	Sarah Power	Sarah Power	Sarah Power
Tara					Ashley Leggat	Ashley Leggat	Ashley Leggat	Ashley Leggat	Ashley Leggat	Rebecca Dalton		Rebecca Dalton		Rebecca Dalton		Rebecca Dalton			
Grace Russell					uncredited	uncredited	Lily-Fay Mowbray	Bailee Madison	Bailee Madison	Bailee Madison	Bailee Madison	Bailee Madison	Bailee Madison	Bailee Madison	Bailee Madison	Bailee Madison			Bailee Madison
Jarod							Randal Edwards			Randal Edwards		Randal Edwards	Randal Edwards	Randal Edwards					
Sam								James Denton	James Denton	James Denton	James Denton	James Denton	James Denton	James Denton	James Denton	James Denton	James Denton	James Denton	James Denton
Ryan								Anthony Lemke		Anthony Lemke									
Stephanie								Kylee Evans	Kylee Evans	Kylee Evans	Kylee Evans	Kylee Evans	Kylee Evans	Kylee Evans	Kylee Evans	Kylee Evans	Kylee Evans	Kylee Evans	Kylee Evans
Nick								Rhys Matthew Bond	Rhys Matthew Bond	Rhys Matthew Bond	Rhys Matthew Bond	Rhys Matthew Bond	Rhys Matthew Bond	Rhys Matthew Bond	Rhys Matthew Bond	Rhys Matthew Bond	Rhys Matthew Bond	Rhys Matthew Bond	
Anthony								Shane Harte											
Linda								Gabrielle Miller	Gabrielle Miller	Gabrielle Miller						Gabrielle Miller			
Ben									Jefferson Brown	Jefferson Brown	Jefferson Brown	Jefferson Brown							
Eve									Kate Corbett	Kate Corbett	Kate Corbett	Kate Corbett	Kate Corbett	Kate Corbett					
John Dover										Dan Payne									
Courtney											Alanna Bale	Alanna Bale		Alanna Bale					
Liam												Seann Gallagher	Seann Gallagher	Seann Gallagher					
Noah												James Swalm		James Rittinger					
Nurse Arrington												JaNae Armogan	JaNae Armogan	JaNae Armogan					
Vincent																Gianpaolo Ventua			Gianpaolo Ventua
Adam																Scott Cavalheiro	Scott Cavalheiro	Scott Cavalheiro	Scott Cavalheiro
Donavan Davenport																Marc Bendavid	Marc Bendavid	Marc Bendavid	Marc Bendavid
Dottie Davenport																Paula Boudreau		Paula Boudreau	Paula Boudreau
Joy Harper																		Katherine Barrell	Katherine Barrell
Claire Tinsdale																		Nicole Wilson	Nicole Wilson
Grant Collins																		Lindsey Owen Pierre	Lindsey Owen Pierre

== Films ==
The Good Witch films are composed of seven films spanning from 2008 to 2014, after which Hallmark opted to continue the storyline via a television series.

=== The Good Witch ===
The Good Witch premiered on the Hallmark Channel on January 19, 2008, and starred Catherine Bell as Cassandra "Cassie" Nightingale and Chris Potter as Chief of Police Jake Russell.

The movie centers upon Cassie, a new arrival to the town of Middleton. She immediately catches the attention of the people around her, particularly Jake, who becomes enamored with her. Cassie also attracts negative attention from Martha Tinsdale, who believes that she is practicing black magic.

The movie had great success on Hallmark Channel on the night of its premiere, making it the second-highest-rated original movie to that date. It premiered with a 3.8 HH (household) rating and was in nearly 3.2 million homes. It also was #1 in its time period, propelling the channel to the #4 spot in weekly ranking.

=== The Good Witch's Garden ===
The Good Witch's Garden premiered on the Hallmark Channel on February 7, 2009. The film's premise centers on Cassie, who is turning her home into a bed and breakfast. Strife comes when a suspicious stranger, Nick, comes into town claiming to be the actual owner of her home, Grey House. Nick claims that it is his birthright, as he is the descendant of the home's original owner, the Grey Lady, and her lover, a captain. Over the course of the film it's proven that the captain was only a fictional creation and that Nick is a grifter who had run similar cons on other homeowners. The film ends with Jake proposing to Cassie.

The film's premiere did moderately well for Hallmark Channel. It scored a 2.7 household rating with over 2.3 million homes, over 3.1 million total viewers and 4.2 million unduplicated viewers. This performance ranked it #1 in the time period as well as the second-highest-rated Prime Time cable movie of the week and day, among all ad-supported cable networks. The film boosted Hallmark Channel to rank #3 in prime time for the day, and #5 for the week.

=== The Good Witch's Gift ===
The Good Witch's Gift premiered on November 13, 2010, and is the third installment in the Hallmark Channel's series of Good Witch television films. The film had a 3.8 HH rating and nearly 3.2 million homes. The film's premise centers on the wedding of Cassie and Jake.

Cassie Nightingale has settled comfortably in Middleton with a successful boutique and is planning her Christmas Eve wedding to Chief of Police Jake Russell (Chris Potter). Leon Deeks, a man Russell put in jail for robbing a bank 10 years ago, gets out of prison and shows up in town to collect the money he'd hidden. Cassie moves in with Jake and arranges for a caretaker, George, to move into Grey House.

=== The Good Witch's Family ===
The Good Witch's Family premiered on the Hallmark Channel on October 29, 2011, and is the fourth film in the series. The film follows Cassie as she must deal with new threats to the wellbeing of her family, friends, and community.

Critical reception for the film was positive and actor Matthew Knight received a 2012 Young Artist Awards nomination for "Best Performance in a TV Movie, Miniseries or Special - Supporting Young Actor" for his role as Brandon Russell.

=== The Good Witch's Charm ===
The Good Witch's Charm aired on the Hallmark Channel on October 27, 2012. Bell and Potter reprised their roles as Cassie and Jake, respectively.

The film focused on Cassie's life as she acclimates to caring for her newborn while also serving as her town's mayor. She's hoping to get a break from her hectic life and take a vacation with her husband Jake and their new family, however this plan is ruined when her stepdaughter is blamed for a recent rash of robberies. A reporter has also arrived in town with the seeming goal of ruining Cassie's reputation, and Cassie's own estranged foster mother has suddenly arrived in town as well.

=== The Good Witch's Destiny ===
The Good Witch's Destiny premiered on Hallmark Channel October 26, 2013 and is the sixth film in the series. Its premiere was watched by 2.82 million viewers and was the channel's most watched original movie to date for 2013 among the network's core demographic, women aged 25–54.

The film's plot centers on Cassie's birthday and her stepdaughter Lori's investigation into Cassie's great aunt who disappeared many years ago.

=== The Good Witch's Wonder ===
The Good Witch's Wonder is the seventh film in the Good Witch film series. It premiered on the Hallmark Channel on October 25, 2014. The film is the last one to star Chris Potter, as he was unable to reprise his character due to scheduling conflicts.

In its original airing on the Hallmark Channel, The Good Witch's Wonder was watched by 2.49 million viewers and had a 0.3 rating among adults aged 18 to 49.

== Television series ==
In February 2014, the Hallmark Channel announced that Good Witch had been green-lighted for a ten-episode series, starring Catherine Bell, to premiere on February 28, 2015. Production for the first season began on October 29, 2014, in Toronto, with Sue Tenney as showrunner. Bailee Madison and James Denton also star. Five further two-hour films, promoted as special episodes, have also aired from 2015 to 2019 in the weeks before Halloween.

Season	Episodes	Originally released	
Season	Episodes	First released	Last released
1	10	February 28, 2015	April 18, 2015
Halloween		October 24, 2015	
2	10	April 17, 2016	June 19, 2016
Secrets of Grey House		October 22, 2016	
3	10	April 30, 2017	July 2, 2017
Spellbound		October 22, 2017	
4	10	April 29, 2018	July 1, 2018
Tale of Two Hearts		October 21, 2018	
5	10	June 9, 2019	August 18, 2019
Curse from a Rose		October 19, 2019	
6	10	May 3, 2020	July 5, 2020
7	10	May 16, 2021	July 25, 2021

== Ratings ==
The table below shows the ratings for the Good Witch films. Ratings for the films and the subsequent television series have been generally favorable.

=== Films ===
Ratings table
Film	Premiere date	Household rating	Viewers (in millions)
The Good Witch	January 19, 2008	3.8	-
The Good Witch's Garden	February 7, 2009	2.7	3.1
The Good Witch's Gift	November 13, 2010	3.8	-
The Good Witch's Family	October 29, 2011	-	-
The Good Witch's Charm	October 27, 2012	-	-
The Good Witch's Destiny	October 26, 2013	-	2.82
The Good Witch's Wonder	October 25, 2014	-	2.49

=== Television ===
Ratings table
Season	Season premiere	Season finale	Viewers (in millions)
1	February 28, 2015	April 18, 2015	2.21
Halloween/Something Wicked	October 24, 2015	-	2.68
2	April 17, 2016	June 19, 2016	2.19
Secrets of Grey House	October 22, 2016	-	2.24
3	April 30, 2017	July 2, 2017	2.147
Spellbound	October 22, 2017	-	2.70
4	April 29, 2018	July 1, 2018	2.137
Tale of Two Hearts	October 21, 2018	-	2.36
5	June 9, 2019	August 18, 2019	2.8
Curse from a Rose	October 19, 2019	-	1.87
6	May 3, 2020	July 5, 2020	2.8
7	May 16, 2021	July 25, 2021	-

== Home video releases ==
Film	DVD release dates		
Film	Region 1	Region 2	Region 4
The Good Witch	January 5, 2010		
The Good Witch's Garden	April 22, 2014		
The Good Witch's Gift	June 17, 2014	March 17, 2014 (DE)	
The Good Witch's Family	September 16, 2014	April 16, 2014 (DE)	
The Good Witch's Charm	October 7, 2014	September 26, 2014 (DE)	
The Good Witch's Destiny		October 24, 2014 (DE)	June 7, 2015
The Good Witch's Wonder			June 7, 2015

=== Box sets ===
Title	DVD or Blu-ray release dates			Films
Title	Region 1	Region 2	Region 4	Films
The Good Witch Collection	October 14, 2014			The Good Witch's Garden; The Good Witch's Gift; The Good Witch's Family; The Good Witch's Charm; Special features: Bonus featurette: On location
Cassie Collection		May 29, 2015 (DE)		The Good Witch's Gift; The Good Witch's Family; The Good Witch's Charm
The Good Witch Collection			February 8, 2017	The Good Witch's Gift; The Good Witch's Family; The Good Witch's Charm; The Good Witch's Destiny; The Good Witch's Wonder
The Good Witch Double Pack			July 10, 2019	The Good Witch's Destiny; The Good Witch's Wonder
Good Witch: The Complete Series (Blu-ray)	October 18, 2022			Good Witch (TV series)
