= Hannah Endicott-Douglas =

Canadian actress (born 1994

Hannah Endicott-Douglass
- Born: November 29, 1994 (age 31); Toronto, Ontario, Canada
- Occupation: Actress
- Years active: 2004–present
- Relatives: Vivien Endicott-Douglas (sister)

Hannah Endicott-Douglas (born November 29, 1994) is a Canadian actress. She is primarily known for her role as Lori Russell in the television film series The Good Witch.

== Early life ==
Endicott-Douglas was born in Toronto to Valerie and Stephen Endicott-Douglas. Her older sister is fellow actress Vivien.

== Career ==
Endicott-Douglas landed her first role at the age of nine in the 2004 television film Samantha: An American Girl Holiday. Her most notable roles are Young Anne Shirley in Anne of Green Gables: A New Beginning, Lori Russell on Good Witch and Ariel Peterson on Slasher.

== Filmography ==
Year	Title	Role	Notes	Ref
2004	Samantha: An American Girl Holiday	Bridget O'Malley	TV movie	
2005–08	Miss BG	Bella Gloria "BG" Baxter (voice)	TV series, 11 episodes	
2006	Franklin and the Turtle Lake Treasure	Little Crow	TV movie (credited as Hanna Endicott-Douglas	
2007–08	My Friend Rabbit	Amber (voice)	TV series, 9 episodes	
2007-2008	Miss Spider's Sunny Patch Friends	Grace (voice)	TV series, 3 episodes (credited as Hanna Endicott-Douglas)	
2008	The Good Witch	Lori Russell	TV movie	
2008	Anne of Green Gables: A New Beginning	Young Anne Shirley	TV movie	
2008	Flashpoint	Lilly	Episode: "Planets Aligned"	
2009	The Good Witch's Garden	Lori Russell	TV movie	
2010	The Good Witch's Gift	Lori Russell	TV movie	
2010	Casino Jack	Sarah Abramoff	Feature film	
2011	My Big Big Friend	Pansy	Episode: "Flower Power"	
2011	The Good Witch's Family	Lori Russell	TV movie	
2011	Murdoch Mysteries	Dorothy Cornell	Episode: "Bloodlust"	
2012	The Good Witch's Charm	Lori Russell	TV movie	
2013	The Good Witch's Destiny	Lori Russell	TV movie	
2014	The Good Witch's Wonder	Lori Russell	TV movie	
2015	Good Witch	Lori Russell	TV series	
2016	Slasher	Ariel Peterson	TV series	
2018	Murdoch Mysteries	Persephone Westerbrook	Episode: "Drowning in Money"	

== Awards and nominations ==
Year	Award	Category	Title of work	Result
2009	Young Artist Award	Best Performance in a TV Movie, Miniseries or Special – Supporting Young Actress	The Good Witch	Nominated
