= Christmas in Wonderland =

- Theatrical release poster
- Directed by: James Orr
- Written by: James Orr; Wanda Birdsong Shope; Jim Cruickshank
- Produced by: Laurette Bourassa
- Starring: Matthew Knight; Chris Kattan; Cameron Bright; Preston Lacy; Carmen Electra; Tim Curry; Patrick Swayze
- Cinematography: Duane Manwiller
- Edited by: Jana Fritsch
- Music by: Terry Frewer
- Distributed by: Yari Film Group; Freestyle Releasing
- Release date: November 21, 2007
- Running time: 98 minutes
- Countries: Canada; United States
- Language: English
- Box office: $772,386

Christmas in Wonderland is a 2007 comedy film about three children who move with their father from Los Angeles to Edmonton, Alberta, where they catch a group of counterfeiters while Christmas shopping.

== Plot ==
The Saunders family has just moved from Los Angeles to Edmonton right before Christmas. They are left with no Christmas spirit, with the exception of the bright eyed 6-year-old Mary. They go to the majestic West Edmonton Mall to do Christmas shopping. 14-year-old Danny and 12-year-old Brian find out that their father, Wayne, had been fired from his job and Christmas might not happen this year. He leaves Danny in charge of Brian and Mary. Mary tells Santa that she wants a million dollars for Christmas for Wayne, although she doesn't know he was fired. She also says the same thing to "Rudolph" the reindeer and Brian tells her that if she wanders off again, the "Mall Ghost" will eat her. They then go to the ice rink.

Meanwhile, Leonard and Sheldon Cardoza are talking about using counterfeit money to get real money in exchange. In an argument, Leonard accidentally knocks it off the ledge and onto the ice rink. Brian and Mary find it and not knowing that it's counterfeit money, go on a shopping spree. Mary thinks Santa gave it to her as an early present. Ginger Peachum goes to Leonard and Sheldon and gets mad at them for losing it. They go to the ice rink to find Brian and Mary, but they have already left. They buy a motorcycle while Wayne is having a tough time choosing a gift for his wife, Judy, who is still in Los Angeles after getting bumped. In the backroom, Gordon McLoosh from the RCMP comes to investigate the case of how counterfeit money is appearing all over the mall with the story of two kids claiming that they won the lottery. They find the address where the motorcycle is to be delivered. They go there and, seeing all the unpacked boxes everywhere, think they are going to move (which is odd, considering they just got there). They find a family photo and use it as evidence. They then search the mall for Wayne, thinking he is the one behind all the counterfeit money.

Brian and Mary are spending the counterfeit money, Wayne is having troubles choosing a gift for Judy, Danny can't find Brian or Mary at Santa's Village, and Leonard and Sheldon are looking for them. However, Danny goes to the amusement park to find them and finally meets the girl from the water park, who invites him to some Booster Juice. They learn they have everything in common such as both being from Los Angeles, both hating Edmonton, her name is Shane (which was his girlfriend's name in Los Angeles), and missing younger siblings. At LAX Airport, Judy is stuck waiting for her plane. There, she meets Kristopher Kringle who informs her that he got bumped too and that she shouldn't worry because "things always work themselves out one way or another". He then leaves to board his plane and shocks her after he knows her name.

After leaving the bar, Wayne gets arrested by Gordon, but he explains that he is innocent. Brian and Mary witness this and after he explains what happened to them, Leonard and Sheldon finally catch up to and chase them. They bump into Ginger, but Brian finds out that Leonard and Sheldon work for her and run away again. Elsewhere, Wayne is getting interrogated but still has no idea what is going on. Just when they find out that the money is counterfeit, mall security bring Leonard and Sheldon to Gordon. The Saunders family gets released and Wayne is very upset at Danny for accidentally leaving Brian and Mary at Santa's Village. On their way out, they walk into Sam Nichols, who owns the mall. He says that he is willing to give Wayne a job. At home, they forgot about getting a tree, presents, or anything. The next morning, Judy is able to get home before Christmas and the kids marvel as they see a tree and presents. The turkey is even ready. Mary gets a letter from Santa saying that he is the one responsible for everything.

== Cast ==
- Matthew Knight as Brian Saunders
- Chris Kattan as Leonard Cardoza
- Cameron Bright as Danny Saunders, Brian's older brother
- Preston Lacy as Sheldon Cardoza, Leonard's older brother
- Amy and Zoe Schlagel as Mary Saunders, Brian's younger sister
- Carmen Electra as Ginger Peachum
- Matthew Walker as Santa Claus, Sam Nichols, Mall Ghost, Kristopher Kringle, and the Old Man with the Walker
- Tim Curry as Gordon McLoosh
- Patrick Swayze as Wayne Saunders, Brian's father
- Rachel Hayward as Judy Saunders, Brian's mother
- MacKenzie Porter as Shane
- Marty Atonini as Elliot Block
- Royce Chartrand as Child Skater

== Production ==
The film is largely set and mostly filmed in West Edmonton Mall. Secrecy before it was announced led many Edmontonians to wonder why Christmas decorations were still in place long after Christmas had passed.

== Release ==
The film was exhibited theatrically in Canada in 2007, but it premiered on television in the United States in 2008 as part of ABC Family's 25 Days of Christmas programming block. It was poorly received by the public.

== Reception ==
On the review aggregator website Rotten Tomatoes, 0% of 7 critics' reviews are positive, with an average rating of 2.3/10.

== See also ==
- List of Christmas films
