= Carnival Eats =

Canadian television series

- Genre: Food reality television
- Directed by: Spencer Ramsay
- Presented by: Noah Cappe
- Country of origin: Canada
- Original language: English
- No. of seasons: 12
- No. of episodes: 197

Production
- Executive producers: James Hyslop; Jennifer Horvath
- Producers: Jennifer Horvath, Jacob Ulrich
- Cinematography: Matt Braun
- Editors: Jeff Pereira, Chris Crosbie, Marco Pazzano, Jordan Hayles
- Running time: 30 minutes
- Production companies: Alibi Entertainment; Amusing Productions

Original release
- Network: Food Network Canada; Cooking Channel
- Release: August 18, 2014 – present

Carnival Eats is a Canadian television series that investigates a range of food vendors at carnivals, state fairs, and festivals across Canada and the United States. Hosted by Noah Cappe, the show features a variety of unique culinary creations found at these events. The series premiered on August 18, 2014.

It is broadcast on Food Network in Canada and on Cooking Channel and Great American Family in the United States.

== Episodes ==
=== Series overview ===
Season	Episodes	Originally released	
Season	Episodes	First released	Last released
1	18	August 18, 2014	July 9, 2015
2	15	July 16, 2015	October 22, 2015
3	21	April 7, 2016	August 11, 2016
4	25	March 9, 2017	August 24, 2017
5	27	October 26, 2017	June 21, 2018
6	13	July 15, 2018	October 7, 2018
7	13	June 9, 2019	September 1, 2019
8	13	September 15, 2019	June 28, 2020
9	18	August 30, 2020	April 18, 2021
10	8	January 8, 2022	June 19, 2022
11	13	July 16, 2023	October 8, 2023
12	13	July 7, 2024	September 29, 2024

=== Season 1 (2014–15) ===
No. overall	Title	Original release date
1	"89er Days Festival/Pungo Strawberry Festival"	August 18, 2014
2	"Viva! Vienna! Festival; Contraband Days Festival"	August 25, 2014
3	"Oak Mountain Spring State Fair; Apache Rattlesnake Festival"	September 1, 2014
4	"Portland Rose Festival; Got to Be NC Fair"	September 8, 2014
5	"Meadowlands State Fair; Gardendale Magnolia Festival"	September 15, 2014
6	"California State Fair; North East Fair"	September 22, 2014
7	"Miami-Dade County Fair; Sarasota County Agricultural Fair"	October 2, 2014
9	"Stanislaus County Fair; Texas Crab Fest"	October 10, 2014
10	"K-Days; North Dakota State Fair"	October 16, 2014
11	"Indiana State Fair; Old Canal Days"	October 23, 2014
12	"Illinois State Fair; Erie County Fair"	November 6, 2014
13	"Ohio State Fair; NC Potato Festival"	November 13, 2014
14	"Canadian National Exhibition; Prairiefest"	November 20, 2014
16	"Calgary Stampede"	December 4, 2014
17	"All American Eats"	July 2, 2015
18	"Go Nuts for Donuts"	July 2, 2015
19	"We Deep Fried That!"	July 9, 2015
20	"Stick It to Me"	July 9, 2015

=== Season 2 (2015) ===
No. in series	Title	Original release date
1	"From Livestock to Lemons"	July 16, 2015
2	"From Renaissance to Rio Grande"	July 23, 2015
3	"From Derby Day to Down State"	July 30, 2015
4	"From Small Town to Farmville"	August 6, 2015
5	"From Crawfish to California"	August 13, 2015
6	"From Chowchilla-Madera to Ciao!"	August 20, 2015
7	"From Strawberry to Silver Dollar"	September 10, 2015
8	"All You Can Meat"	September 3, 2015
9	"Fully Loaded"	September 10, 2015
10	"From Golden State to Gizzards"	September 17, 2015
11	"From Michigan to Maize"	September 24, 2015
12	"From Cornfields to Canada"	October 1, 2015
13	"From Heatwave to Heartland"	October 8, 2015
14	"From West Coast to Wisconsin"	October 15, 2015
15	"From Rock and Roll to Red River"	October 22, 2015

=== Season 3 (2016) ===
No. in series	Title	Original release date
1	"Royals and the Red River City"	April 7, 2016
2	"Lights and Literature"	April 14, 2016
3	"Burger and Bombs"	April 21, 2016
4	"Freak Show of Funnel Cakes"	April 21, 2016
5	"Cowboys and Cakes"	April 28, 2016
6	"Say Cheese!"	April 28, 2016
7	"Mac and Cheese and Monster Meat"	May 5, 2016
8	"Bowls and Rolls"	May 12, 2016
9	"Dumplings and Pumpkins"	May 19, 2016
10	"Shepherd's Pie and Sunday Dinner Sundaes"	May 26, 2016
11	"Clams and Cannoli"	June 2, 2016
12	"Hot Doggin'"	June 2, 2016
13	"Meat and Mandarins"	June 9, 2016
14	"Everything's Better With Bacon"	June 9, 2016
15	"Funnel Cakes and Fried Fudge"	June 16, 2016
16	"Feast and Fries"	June 23, 2016
17	"Hogs and Dogs"	June 30, 2016
18	"Ice Cream Dream"	July 7, 2016
19	"Fusion Fiesta"	July 14, 2016
20	"North Dakota State Fair; Prairiefest"	August 4, 2016
21	"From Fertile Fields to the Red River Valley"	August 11, 2016

=== Season 4 (2017) ===
No. in series	Title	Original release date
1	"Some Like It Popped"	March 9, 2017
2	"When Harry Met Salad"	March 16, 2017
3	"Dawn of the Bread"	March 23, 2017
4	"Meat, Pray, Love"	March 30, 2017
5	"Zacho Libre"	April 6, 2017
6	"Jurassic Pork"	April 13, 2017
7	"A Guac to Remember"	April 20, 2017
8	"Cheesy Rider"	April 27, 2017
9	"Get Him to the Greek Pizza"	May 4, 2017
10	"The Rainbow Confection"	May 11, 2017
11	"Piefidelity"	May 18, 2017
12	"The Good, the Bacon, the Ugly"	May 25, 2017
13	"50 Shades of Crepe"	June 1, 2017
14	"Burger Bonanza"	June 8, 2017
15	"Breakfast of Champions"	June 15, 2017
16	"Berry Delicious"	June 22, 2017
17	"Get Stuffed"	June 29, 2017
18	"Tacos del Carnival"	July 6, 2017
19	"Carnival Italiano"	July 13, 2017
20	"Supersized"	July 20, 2017
21	"The Heat Is On"	July 27, 2017
22	"Everything's Bigger and Better in Texas"	August 3, 2017
23	"California Dreamin'"	August 10, 2017
24	"Pizza Party"	August 17, 2017
25	"Tis the Season"	August 24, 2017

=== Season 5 (2017–18) ===
No. in series	Title	Original release date
1	"Close Encounters of the Food Kind"	October 26, 2017
2	"The French Toast Connection"	November 2, 2017
3	"Million Dollar Baby Cakes"	November 9, 2017
4	"Children of the Corn on the Cob"	November 16, 2017
5	"Point Break-fast"	November 23, 2017
6	"Planet of the Funnel Cakes"	November 30, 2017
7	"Grill Bill"	February 1, 2018
8	"Fry Harder"	February 8, 2018
9	"Scone with the Wind"	February 15, 2018
10	"Eating Las Vegas"	February 22, 2018
11	"The King Crab and I"	March 1, 2018
12	"The Waffle Truth"	March 8, 2018
13	"Aporkalypse Now"	March 15, 2018
14	"Festival of Fries"	March 22, 2018
15	"Munchies on the Go"	March 29, 2018
16	"Southern Treats"	April 5, 2018
17	"Bayou Bites"	April 12, 2018
18	"Noah's Favs"	April 19, 2018
19	"Family Dinner"	April 26, 2018
20	"Nacho, Nacho Man"	May 3, 2018
21	"Local Legends"	May 10, 2018
22	"Tons of Taters"	May 17, 2018
23	"Beach Eats"	May 24, 2018
24	"Bacon 2: The Sequel"	May 31, 2018
25	"Campfire Creations"	June 7, 2018
26	"Seafood Sampler"	June 14, 2018
27	"The Mighty Meatless"	June 21, 2018

=== Season 6 (2018) ===
No. in series	Title	Original release date
1	"Garlic's Angels"	July 15, 2018
2	"Dates on a Plane"	July 22, 2018
3	"Mad Snacks: Berry Road"	July 29, 2018
4	"Requiem for an Ice Cream"	August 5, 2018
5	"Eggs Men"	August 12, 2018
6	"Planet of the Dates"	August 19, 2018
7	"There Will Be Bacon"	August 26, 2018
8	"Mocktail"	September 2, 2018
9	"Beauty and the Beef"	September 9, 2018
10	"Fight Club Sandwich"	September 16, 2018
11	"Hot Dog Time Machine"	September 23, 2018
12	"Ham-let"	September 30, 2018
13	"A-Frying in Winter"	October 7, 2018

=== Season 7 (2019) ===
No. in series	Title	Original release date
1	"Smokey And The Slamwich"	June 9, 2019
2	"Citizen Candy Cane"	June 16, 2019
3	"Pretzel-a, Queen Of Dessert"	June 23, 2019
4	"Gordita, Pray, Love"	June 30, 2019
5	"Rowdy With A Chance Of Meatballs"	July 7, 2019
6	"There's Something About Cherry"	July 14, 2019
7	"Seoul Dip Sisters"	July 21, 2019
8	"The Devil Wears Pasta"	July 28, 2019
9	"Bite Club"	August 4, 2019
10	"Hawaii Fried Dough"	August 11, 2019
11	"Toastbusters"	August 18, 2019
12	"Steak Out"	August 25, 2019
13	"Deep-fried Inferno"	September 1, 2019

=== Season 8 (2019–20) ===
No. in series	Title	Original release date
1	"Grillers in the Mist"	September 15, 2019
2	"My Fair Latte"	September 22, 2019
3	"Camp Pop"	September 29, 2019
4	"Souperman"	October 6, 2019
5	"Jackie Hash Brown"	May 3, 2020
6	"Attack of the Mac and Cheese"	May 10, 2020
7	"Dude, Where's My Carb?"	May 17, 2020
8	"You've Got Ale"	May 24, 2020
10	"Gourmets of the Galaxy"	May 31, 2020
11	"The Fryin' King"	June 7, 2020
12	"Fries in Disguise"	June 14, 2020
13	"The King's Peach"	June 21, 2020
14	"Fairground Showdown"	June 28, 2020

=== Season 9 (2020–21) ===
No. in series	Title	Original release date
1	"The Postman Always Brings Rice"	August 30, 2020
2	"Orange is the New Snack"	September 6, 2020
3	"Pretzella Queen of the Desserts"	September 13, 2020
4	"It's A Wonderful Bite"	September 20, 2020
5	"Cheese Please!"	September 27, 2020
6	"Super Sundaes"	October 4, 2020
7	"The Dining"	October 11, 2020
8	"Carnival Classics Gone Wild"	October 18, 2020
9	"Asian Sensations"	October 25, 2020
10	"Return of the Mac"	November 1, 2020
11	"Pepper Popper Party"	November 8, 2020
12	"Sweet 'n' Savory Sensations"	November 15, 2020
13	"Deliciously Doughy"	November 22, 2020
14	"Six Degrees of Bacon"	April 11, 2021
15	"Fruity Favorites"	May 2, 2021
16	"Twisted Creations"	May 9, 2021
17	"Super Sandwiches"	April 18, 2021
18	"Latin Fiesta"	April 25, 2021

=== Season 10 (2022) ===
No. in series	Title	Original release date
1	"The Wild Brunch"	January 8, 2022
2	"How the West Was Yum"	January 9, 2022
3	"Okla-hoagie!"	January 15, 2022
4	"Pulp Kitchen"	January 15, 2022
5	"The Hunt for Breaded Oktoberfest"	January 23, 2022
6	"Doughboy Does Dallas"	January 30, 2022
7	"Natural Corn Grillers"	January 30, 2022
8	"Under Texas Fries"	June 19, 2022

=== Season 11 (2023) ===
No. in series	Title	Original release date
1	"Starship Scoopers"	July 16, 2023
2	"Some Like It Hot Dog"	July 23, 2023
3	"The Corn Identify"	July 30, 2023
4	"Bring It Tur-On"	August 6, 2023
5	"From Dusk Of Donut"	August 13, 2023
6	"Silence of the Spams"	August 20, 2023
7	"Uncut Grape Gems"	August 27, 2023
8	"Wolf of Walla Walla Street"	September 3, 2023
9	"The Hills Have Fries"	September 10, 2023
10	"There's Something About Bloody Mary"	September 17, 2023
11	"Churro Dark Thirty"	September 24, 2023
12	"Steak on a Plantain"	October 1, 2023
13	"Midnight Bao-Boy"	October 8, 2023

=== Season 12 (2024) ===
No. in series	Title	Original release date
1	"Parmageddon"	July 7, 2024
2	"Swai School Musical"	July 14, 2024
3	"Brunch Drunk Love"	July 21, 2024
4	"Brûlée-dy and the Tramp"	July 28, 2024
5	"Any Given Shrimp and Grits Sunday"	August 4, 2024
6	"The Eggs-Files"	August 11, 2024
7	"Risky Biscuit"	August 18, 2024
8	"A Few Good Ramen"	August 25, 2024
9	"Pizza Mac And Me"	September 1, 2024
10	"Banh Mi, Myself and Irene"	September 8, 2024
11	"Crab Rangoonies"	September 15, 2024
12	"The Big Chili"	September 22, 2024
13	"2 Fast 2 Furikake"	September 29, 2024
