= Shoebox Zoo =

British-Canadian children's television series (2004–2005)

- Shoebox Zoo Logo
- Genre: Fantasy
- Starring: Vivien Endicott-Douglas; Jason Connery; Peter Mullan; Alan Cumming; Simon Callow; Siobhan Redmond; Rik Mayall; David McKay
- Narrated by: Bill Paterson
- Countries of origin: United Kingdom; Canada
- Original language: English
- No. of series: 2
- No. of episodes: 26

Production
- Running time: 25 mins
- Production companies: Blueprint Entertainment; BBC Scotland; Alberta Filmworks

Original release
- Network: BBC One (United Kingdom); CBC Television (Canada)
- Release: 21 September 2004 – 27 November 2005

Shoebox Zoo is a fantasy television series made in a collaboration between BBC Scotland and various Canadian television companies. It is mostly live-action, but with CGI used for the animal figurines. It was first broadcast in 2004, by CBBC. The series was broadcast in the United States by the Showtime network and in Jamaica by CVM Television.

== Series overview ==
The series was conceived by then-BBC Scotland director Claire Mundell and television director Justin Molotnikov in 2002, and then further developed by Brian Ward. The series was co-produced by Toronto-based company Blueprint Entertainment, founded by John Morayniss, who previously worked at Alliance Atlantis, where he helped produce another CBBC programme Ace Lightning. The series consists of twenty-six episodes, split between two seasons made up of thirteen episodes each. The titular Shoebox Zoo were computer generated by Alias Systems Corporation, the characters designed with Celtic mythology and artwork in designs. Paul Kavanagh, a BBC post production animator, aided in the character designs.

=== Setting ===
Shoebox Zoo mixes Scottish, Celtic, and later, Native American mythology. The first season is set primarily in Edinburgh and other historic locations, while the second season moves to Denver, though the season was shot in Canada. The series' protagonist, Marnie McBride, an eleven-year old girl moves to Edinburgh with her father Ross following the unexpected death of her mother Rosemary. On her birthday, Marnie receives a shoebox containing four carved toy animals from a junk shop owner. Marnie discovers she can magically bring the toys to life, referred to collectively as the Shoebox Zoo. The four are in fact humans transformed into toys by their master, Michael Scot, an immortal alchemist, for stealing his magical codex, the Book of Forbidden Knowledge.

In the series' backstory, Michael Scot lived in 12th century Scotland, where he crafted the Book of Forbidden Knowledge, containing his scholarly work on alchemy and magic. However, the book contained black magic forged from Michael's pride and ambition. He created the series's antagonist, Juan Roberto Montoya de Toledo, a shapeshifting Spanish-accented homunculus, using the book's magic. However, Toledo was rejected by Michael, inspiring him to seize the book's power and conquer the world. Michael's four students - Edwin, Bruno, Ailsa, and his own son Wolfgang - steal the book to hide it from Toledo, though Wolfgang takes it out of spite towards his negligent father. The book is lost, Michael transforming the four into toys and putting them to sleep until a prophesied Chosen One, identified as Marnie, possesses magic to awaken them and find the book.

The second season further expands the backstory. After being lost at sea, the Book of Forbidden Knowledge washed ashore in Colorado in 1811, discovered by Marnie's ancestor Angus McBride, an explorer, who gave the book to the local Lakota people led by Chief Stonebear in exchange for marrying his daughter. Discovering the book's magic to be evil, Stonebear and other chieftains made preparations to destroy the book, casting it down the Falls of Faith, and designed the Arrow of Truth and Bow of Wisdom to vanquish its magic. The book disappeared into history once again, though Stonebear's descendants were aware of its location in the Denver forests.

=== Synopsis ===
The first season begins with Marnie McBride's eleventh birthday. She and her father Ross visit a junk shop, where the shopkeeper gives Marnie a shoebox containing four carved toy animals. Marnie awakens the Shoebox Zoo from their centuries-long slumber and begrudgingly accepts to quest to find the Book of Forbidden Knowledge and transform the toys back to humanity. Michael watches over her from Tantallon Castle, his ancestral home, while Toledo serves as an antagonistic force, aided by McTaggart, actually a mole working for Michael. Toledo poses as John Roberts, Marnie's schoolmate, but his identity is exposed. Wolfgang, jealous that Marnie became Michael's heir apparent, sides with Toledo to act as a spy. Marnie's late mother Rosemary serves in a pivotal role throughout the first season, once considered a potential chosen one by Michael when she briefly owned the toys, but did not possess the magic to awaken them. However, Rosemary appears as a ghost in the series, possessing knowledge of the book and events of the past.

Marnie and the toys follow a series of clues across Scotland, eventually discovering the book hidden in the University of Edinburgh's library. Wolfgang is revealed as a spy, but betrays Toledo upon making amends with his father. Toledo assaults Marnie's home, accompanied by Los Contrarios, evil twins of the Shoebox Zoo fashioned by Toledo's magic. However, when they are destroyed and Marnie refuses to surrender the book, Toledo retaliates by casting Wolfgang into a fire, killing him. Marnie eventually discovers the book is in fact a copy, designed to contain Toledo's magic. Toledo is seemingly defeated, and Marnie experiences a vision, learning the real book was sent out to sea and lies somewhere in the United States.

In the second season, Marnie and the Shoebox Zoo fly to Denver, Michael and McTaggart aiding them from afar. Marnie stays with her maternal grandparents, and is aided by her best friend Kyle Stone, a descendant of Chief Stonebear. Kyle's grandfather, Nathaniel, the spiritual medicine man of the Lakota people, aids Marnie, along with Hunter, a Native American spirit who can manifest in a horse-shaped ceremonial dancing stick. Michael learns of a second prophecy in which the book will be obtained by the malevolent Dawn Queen, who will use its magic to corrupt mankind. Toledo rises as a ghost, murders Michael, transforms a captured McTaggart into a weasel, and possesses the Dawn Queen's mortal self, Aurora Dexter, an ambitious television medium. Needing clues to find the book, Ailsa suggests contacting Marnie's mother in the afterlife. However, Marnie is slowly corrupted by the book's magic and plots to use it to resurrect her mother altogether.

Marnie summons Wolfgang's ghost to lead her to the book's location, taking her to the Falls of Faith. Edwin and Ailsa free McTaggart who battles Toledo but is sent plummeting down the falls to his death. Marnie finds the book beneath her grandfather's woodshed, containing an electric generator which channels the book's energy, but Toledo steals it. Aurora, now the Dawn Queen, restores Toledo's body but enslaves him. Marnie makes the decision to destroy the book using the Bow of Wisdom and Arrow of Truth, but the toys fear losing their one opportunity to regain their humanity. Aurora and Toledo plot to unleash the book's magic on live television.

Marnie resurrects Wolfgang to complete a binding spell designed to suppress the book's magic, and the group confront Aurora, using the Nathaniel's sacred bundle to weaken her magic. Marnie then teleports herself to the Falls of Faith, firing the Arrow of Truth down it, which destroys the book, Toledo, and frees Aurora from her evil persona. At the end of the series, Marnie, now twelve years old, leaves the Shoebox Zoo in the same junk shop her mother found them in years before. In the closing moments, the series' narrator approaches and awakens the toys for his own unseen quest.

== Cast and characters ==
=== Main characters ===
- Vivien Endicott-Douglas as Marnie McBride, the main protagonist. An 11-year old girl who moves from Denver to Edinburgh following her mother's death, Marnie discovers she has magical powers and is the Chosen One, destined to find the Book of Forbidden Knowledge. At first moody and reluctant to take on her role, Marnie embraces her destiny, coming to terms with her mother's death. Shoebox Zoo was Endicott-Douglas' first acting role in television.
- Jason Connery as Ross McBride, Marnie's widowed father who works as a librarian at the University of Edinburgh.
  - Connery also cameos Angus McBride, Marnie's ancestor, who marries Stone Bear's daughter in 1811.
- Peter Mullan as Michael Scot, an eleven-hundred year oldalchemist, and Wolfgang's estranged father. Based on the historical figure, Michael created both the Book and Toledo in his pursuit for power, corrupted by his own dark intents, leading to many of the events that set up the series' backstory. Although cantankerous, he is wise and mentors Marnie in both magical and personal issues, coming to acknowledge his own sins in the process.
- David McKay as William McTaggart, Michael Scot's loyal manservant, cursed with immortality for his part in the Book's theft and loss.
- Tony Donaldson as Professor Juan Montoya de Toledo, the series' antagonist. A shapeshifting homunculus created by Scot, Toledo seeks to acquire the Book to conquer the world and prove his superiority to his creator. He is suave and manipulative, but short-tempered and sociopathic. Due to his shapeshifting abilities, Toledo takes on the form of several disguises, including:
  - Maxi Moffat as John Roberts, Marnie's classmate.
  - Kirsty Elkin as Dr. Joanna Robertson, a psychiatrist.
- Yudii Mercredi as Kyle Stone, Marnie's friend of Lakota descent. Kyle is a descendant of Chief Stone Bear, possessing his own powers called "horse magic", destined to succeed his grandfather Nathaniel as the local medicine man.
- Gordon Tootoosis as Nathaniel Stone, Kyle's grandfather and a medicine man.
- Natascha Girgis as Aurora Dexter, an antagonist in the second season. A television medium from Valentine, Nebraska, Aurora is destined to become the Dawn Queen, a malevolent entity who is prophesied to use the Book's dark magic to corrupt mankind. Toledo possesses her to ensure the prophecy comes to pass.
- Rik Mayall as Edwin, the pompous, self-proclaimed leader of the Shoebox Zoo, transformed into a metal toy eagle. His name and inability to fly is a nod to Olympic ski jumper Eddie the Eagle.
- Alan Cumming as Bruno, a kind-hearted though woolly-minded toy bear made of stone.
- Siobhan Redmond as Ailsa, a cynical and distrusting golden toy adder.
- Simon Callow as Wolfgang Scot, Michael's son, transformed into a wooden toy wolf, who carries a deep resentment towards his father.
  - Callows also voices Hunter, a free-spirited Native American spirit who materialises in a horse-shaped dancing stick. He repeatedly introduces himself as "Sunkwaki, Spirit of the Horse Dance, son of Wakangli, war horse of Chief Inkpaduta, loyal servant of Wakan Tanka, etc."
- Bill Paterson as the Storyteller, the series' narrator. In the final episode, it is implied this unseen character inherits the Shoebox Zoo as their next master.

=== Recurring characters ===
- Krystina Coates as Laura, Marnie's best friend in Edinburgh.
- Sean Young as Stewart, a school bully.
- Fergus Nimmo as Dougie, a school bully, who eventually becomes Marnie's friend.
- Kelsey Collins as Becky Dexter, Aurora's daughter.
- Paul Coeur as Bobby Campbell, Marnie's maternal grandfather.
- Valerie Ann Pearson as Dorothy Campbell, Marnie's maternal grandmother.
- Sammy Simon as Chief Stone Bear, Kyle and Nathaniel's ancestor, who hid the Book in the Denver forests.
- Frances Low as Ms. McKay, Marnie's teacher in Edinburgh.
- Dorothy Duffy as Ms. Arnot, a fellow teacher.
- Sanjeev Kohli as Mr. Kasmani, the bungling headteacher of Marnie's school.
- Nathaniel Arcand as Cousin Henry, Kyle's relative.

== Episodes ==
The programme was first broadcast on 21 September 2004 on BBC One, and the last episode was shown on 27 November 2005.

Series 1:

- 1. 'The Magic is Awakened' (21 September 2004)
- 2. 'Friend or Foe?' (28 September 2004)
- 3. 'Echoes of the Past' (5 October 2004)
- 4. 'A Guide for the Perplexed' (12 October 2004)
- 5. 'The Inner Sanctum' (19 October 2004)
- 6. 'A Strange Birthday Party' (26 October 2004)
- 7. 'A Little Knowledge' (2 November 2004)
- 8. 'Mother's Footsteps' (9 November 2004)
- 9. 'Where the River Flows' (16 November 2004)
- 10. 'The Sign of the Unicorn' (23 November 2004)
- 11. 'Where Four Elevens Meet' (30 November 2004)
- 12. 'Los Contrarios' (7 December 2004)
- 13. 'The Day of Reckoning' (14 December 2004)

Series 2:

- 1. 'Across the Great Ocean' (16 October 2005)
- 2. 'The Balance of Power' (23 October 2005)
- 3. 'Snakes Alive' (23 October 2005)
- 4. 'The Pow Wow' (30 October 2005)
- 5. 'Hunter to the Rescue' (30 October 2005)
- 6. 'Coming of Age' (6 November 2005)
- 7. 'Wild Horses' (6 November 2005)
- 8. 'Bumps in the Night' (13 November 2005)
- 9. 'The Eagle Has Landed' (13 November 2005)
- 10. 'The Arrow of Truth' (20 November 2005)
- 11. 'The Cry of the Wolf' (20 November 2005)
- 12. 'The Falls of Faith' (27 November 2005)
- 13. 'Beyond the Beyond' (27 November 2005)

== Locations ==
The series makes good use of its Lothian setting, with significant locations including the University of Edinburgh library, Tantallon Castle, Boroughmuir High School and St Giles Cathedral, while Toledo makes his base in the clock tower of the Balmoral Hotel. Many interior sets were built at the Castle Brae Business Centre (formally Castlebrae High School) in Edinburgh. The second season was filmed in Alberta, Canada.
