= Terry (film) =

2005 Canadian television film

- Written by: Dennis Foon
- Directed by: Don McBrearty
- Starring: Shawn Ashmore; Noah Reid; Ryan McDonald
- Music by: Robert Carli
- Country of origin: Canada
- Original languages: English; French

Production
- Producers: Gail Harvey; Christina Jennings; Laurie McLarty
- Cinematography: Gerald Packer
- Editor: Tom Joerin
- Running time: 120 minutes
- Production company: Shaftesbury Films

Original release
- Network: CTV Television Network
- Release: 11 September 2005

Terry is a 2005 Canadian biographical television film produced by Shaftesbury Films for CTV. Directed by Don McBrearty and written by Dennis Foon, it dramatizes the Marathon of Hope, a cross-Canada run undertaken by the amputee athlete Terry Fox to raise funds for cancer research. Terry was in part conceived as a response to the 1983 film The Terry Fox Story, which had been criticized by Fox's family for inaccurately depicting him as short-tempered.

Fox is portrayed by Shawn Ashmore, who is not an actual amputee himself. To authentically depict Fox's disability, the filmmakers used a real amputee as a body double in some scenes and digitally overlaid a prosthesis onto Ashmore's actual leg in other scenes.

== Cast ==
- Shawn Ashmore as Terry Fox
- Ryan McDonald as Doug Alward
- Noah Reid as Darrell Fox
- Matt Gordon as Bill Vigars
- Catherine Disher as Betty Fox
- David Huband as Rolly Fox
- Adam Butcher as Chad
- David Keeley as Bobby Orr
- Shannon Lawson as Mrs. Jones
- Vivien Endicott-Douglas as Judy Fox
- Grant Darby as Terry Fox (body double)

== Production ==
Terry was directed by Emmy Award winning Don McBrearty. The TV movie cost $4 million to produce and took a duration of 21 days to film, over the summer. The cast and crew quickly learned the struggles that Fox went through during his marathon. In an article published by The Globe and Mail McBrearty stated, "We filmed in intense heat and we were exhausted just trying to retrace his steps. And we didn't run the daily marathon that Terry did. He started most mornings at 5 and went to bed by 8 o'clock. But as events progressed and he got into Ontario, when he became more popular, he had to go to receptions, sometimes two or three in a night. None of us can figure out how he did it, running 26 miles every day. It's hard to fathom." Shawn Ashmore who depicts Terry Fox in the film also went through difficulties trying to portray Fox accurately. Due to Fox only having one leg and a prosthetic leg, Ashmore's leg was removed in post production digitally. He stated in the same article from The Globe and Mail that, "The roughest part is the physicality, learning the skip-hop to make it real, and remembering and knowing the movement." He has stated that didn't want to harm Fox's legacy and did so by training very hard and getting into shape for all of the running that would be required for filming.

== Release ==
Terry was released in Canada on September 11, 2005. It was also released in Hungary on the 21st of September in 2006 and in the UK on February 25, 2007.

== See also ==
- List of films about the sport of athletics
