= Snakes and Ladders (Canadian TV series) =

Canadian television series

- Genre: Political drama
- Created by: Wayne Grigsby
- Starring: Catherine Disher; Amy Price-Francis; Jeremy Akerman
- Country of origin: Canada
- No. of seasons: 1
- No. of episodes: 6

Production
- Running time: 60 minutes

Original release
- Network: CBC
- Release: February 11 – March 17, 2004

Snakes and Ladders is a Canadian political drama television miniseries created by Wayne Grigsby which aired on CBC Television in 2004. The series starred Amy Price-Francis as Shannon Jennings, a woman who takes a job as an executive assistant at Parliament Hill for a cabinet minister named Audrey Flankman (Catherine Disher). The series was shot in documentary style, and was produced by the same people who produced the series Trudeau.

== Cast ==
- Catherine Disher as Minister Audrey Flankman
- Amy Price-Francis as Shannon Jennings
- Jeremy Akerman as Lamar
- Matthew Ferguson as Donnie Logan
- Marcel Jeannin as Patrick Arthur Lewis

== Episodes ==
1. Premiere
2. The Bling Bling
3. American Pie
4. Section 24
5. Squattergate
6. Sisters

== Awards ==
Snakes and Ladders was nominated for both Writers Guild of Canada and Directors Guild of Canada awards. It was also nominated for 7 Gemini Awards, with Catherine Disher winning best performance by an actress for her role.
