= Catherine Disher =

British actress

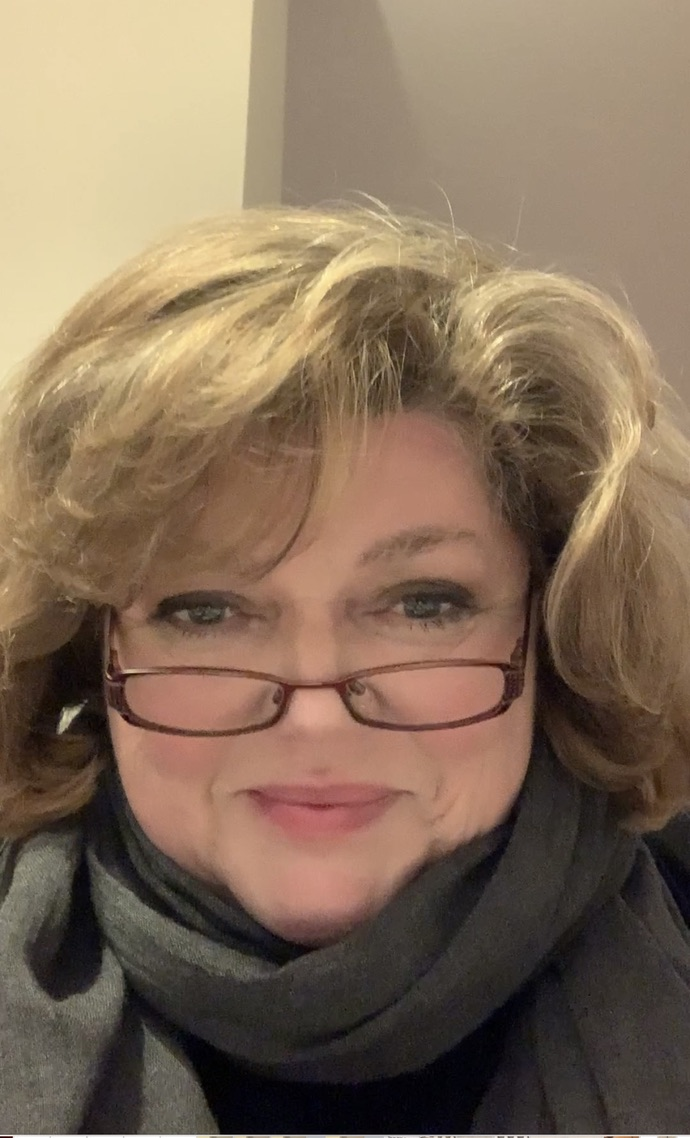
- Disher in 2024
- Born: England
- Occupation: Actress
- Years active: 1986–present
- Spouse: Cedric Smith (divorced)
- Children: 1

Catherine Disher is a British actress. She has won two Gemini Awards: in 2005 for Best Actress for her role in the Canadian miniseries Snakes and Ladders, and in 2010 for her role in The Border. She was also nominated for her role as Dr. Natalie Lambert in the Forever Knight television series.

== Career ==
Disher had a supporting role on T. and T., the legal/action series starring Mr. T, and had another supporting role in the second season of the War of the Worlds series. She starred in Forever Knight from 1992 to 1996, and provided the voice of Jean Grey on the X-Men animated series from 1992 to 1997. She played Maggie Norton on the Canadian television series The Border from 2008 to 2010 and provides additional voices on the PBS Kids/CBC Kids series Super Why!.

Apart from her work as an actor, Disher has done voice work for animated series and video games, such as Resident Evil 3: Nemesis and Sailor Moon. She also wrote one episode of the British-Canadian-Midwestern-French drama series The Campbells.

Disher played Martha Tinsdale in a series of made-for-TV movies about The Good Witch (alongside her X-Men co-star Chris Potter), and has continued the role on the television series Good Witch until the TV series ended in July 2021.

== Personal life ==
She was formerly married to her X-Men co-star Cedric Smith, with whom she had a son in 1993.

== Filmography ==
=== Live action ===
==== Film ====
Year	Title	Role	Notes
1986	The Vindicator	Catherine Collins	
1986	Murder Sees the Light		Television film
1987	Haunted by Her Past	Salesgirl	Television film
1988	A New Life	Student	
1989	The Long Road Home	Bayla	
1989	The Private Capital		Television film
1990	Dark Horse		
1991	The Psychic	Lucinda	
1991	Grand Larceny	Dulcie	Television film
1993	Woman on the Run: The Lawrencia Bembenek Story	Judy Zess	Television film
1998	Earthquake in New York	Ms. Clark	Television film
2003	Coast to Coast	Paula Hobday	
2004	Plain Truth	Leda	Television film
2005	Murder in the Hamptons	D. A. Dynak	Television film
2005	Terry	Betty Fox	Television film
2005	Spirit Bear: The Simon Jackson Story	Ms. Starr	Television film
2006	A Dad for Christmas	Beverly	Television film
2007	In God's Country	Eileen	Television film
2007	For Lease	Viola Checkny	Short film
2008	The Good Witch	Martha Tinsdale	Television film
2009	The Good Witch's Garden	Martha Tinsdale	Television film
2010	The Good Witch's Gift	Martha Tinsdale	Television film
2011	The Good Witch's Family	Martha Tinsdale	Television film
2012	Foxfire: Confessions of a Girl Gang	Mrs. O'Hagan	
2012	Blood Pressure	Glenda	
2012	The Good Witch's Charm	Martha Tinsdale	Television film
2012	An Officer and a Murderer	Captain Catherine Novak	Television film
2013	The Good Witch's Destiny	Martha Tinsdale	Television film
2014	The Good Witch's Wonder	Martha Tinsdale	Television film
2015	Regression	Kate	
2016	Love's Complicated	J.R.	Television film

==== Television ====
Year	Title	Role	Notes
1986	Night Heat	Female Cop	Episode: "Pay Day"
1988–90	T. and T.	Sophie Rideau	Recurring role
1988–93	Katts and Dog	Katherine Anderson	Recurring role
1988–89	Friday the 13th: The Series	Cathy Steiner, Crystal	2 episodes
1989–90	War of the Worlds	Mana	Recurring role
1989–90	The Campbells	Christine Bradford / Christine Bradford Campbell	3 episodes
1989	Alfred Hitchcock Presents	Cindy Bertozzi	Episode: "In the Name of Science"
1991	Street Legal	Violet Beltane	Episodes: "Eye of the Beholder", "Hollywood North"
1991	Conspiracy of Silence	Sherrie	Miniseries
1992–96	Forever Knight	Dr. Natalie Lambert	Main cast
1993–95	Kung Fu: The Legend Continues	Karen Kaden, Madeline Palmer	Episode: "Straitjacket" as Karen Kaden; Episode: "Gunfighters" as Madeline Palmer
1997	North Shore Fish	Carole	Television film
1997	PSI Factor: Chronicles of the Paranormal	Jane Conacher	Episode: "The Greenhouse Effect"
1998	Goosebumps	Mrs. Warren	Episode: "Awesome Ants"
1999	Dear America: The Winter of Red Snow	Mrs. Washington	Television film
2000	D.C.	Prosecutor	
2000	Traders	Mrs. Exeter	Episode: "Hawks"
2002	The Associates	Janet Dry	
2004	Snakes and Ladders	Minister Audrey Flankman	Miniseries; won Gemini Award for Best Actress in a Dramatic Program or Mini-Series
2006	Life with Derek	Mrs. Pummelman	
2006	The Path to 9/11	Diana Dean	Miniseries
2008–10	The Border	Maggie Norton	Main cast; won Gemini Award for Best Actress in a Dramatic Series
2011	Murdoch Mysteries	Mrs. Galbraith	Episode: "Dead End Street"
2014	Remedy	Linda Tuttle	Recurring role
2014	Rookie Blue	Superintendent Helen Brooks	Episode: "Deal with the Devil"
2014	Degrassi: The Next Generation	Rhonda Patterson	
2015–19, 2021	Good Witch	Mayor Martha Tinsdale, Maxine Endicott	Main cast; 1 episode as Maxine Endicott (2021)
2024–25	Law & Order Toronto: Criminal Intent	Deb Sutton	2 episodes

=== Voice work ===
- Miss BG - Mrs. Martin
- X-Men: The Animated Series - Jean Grey / Marvel Girl / Phoenix, Additional voices
- Spider-Man: The Animated Series - Jean Grey
- Sailor Moon - Elizabeth, Mimet, Nekonell
- Atomic Betty - Penelope Lang, Sarah
- Care Bears: Journey to Joke-a-lot - Friend Bear
- The Care Bears' Big Wish Movie - Friend Bear
- Super Why! - Additional voices
- Stickin' Around - Mrs. Stella Stickler
- Wild C.A.T.s - Additional voices
- Highlander: The Animated Series - Additional voices
- A Miser Brothers' Christmas - Mrs. Claus
- Franklin - Mrs. Goose
- Franklin and the Green Knight - Mrs. Goose
- Peep and the Big Wide World - Dragonfly
- Miss Spider's Sunny Patch Friends - Druey-Ruby's Mom
- Mr. Men and Little Miss - Mr. Muddle, Little Miss Splendid, Little Miss Naughty, Little Miss Neat, Little Miss Tiny, Little Miss Helpful, Little Miss Lucky, Little Miss Brainy, Little Miss Stubborn, Little Miss Curious, Little Miss Somersault, additional voices
- Helen Crawford - Ms Sandy
- Noddy - Noddy, Master Tubby Bear, Sly
- Babar - Additional voices
- Rolie Polie Olie - Mrs. Bromley "Polina" Polie, Hammy Lady ("Through Trick and Thin"), TV Contestant ("Guess It's Nite Nite"), Tape Voice ("Babies Go Home")
- Rolie Polie Olie: The Great Defender of Fun - Mrs. Bromley "Polina" Polie, TV Journalist
- Rolie Polie Olie: The Baby Bot Chase - Mrs. Bromley "Polina" Polie, Tape Voice
- Police Academy: The Animated Series - Auntie Bertha
- Little Bear - Additional voices
- The Little Bear Movie - Mrs. Moose
- Ultraforce - Topaz
- Free Willy - Additional voices
- Mythic Warriors: Guardians of the Legend - Female Peasant, Plump Chambermaid, Theseus' Mother
- Ned's Newt - Additional voices
- Pippi Longstocking - Additional voices
- Puppets Who Kill - Lindsay Fang
- Ace Ventura: Pet Detective - Additional voices
- Abby Hatcher - Judge Thorn
- The Busy World of Richard Scarry - Additional voices
- Rescue Heroes - Additional voices
- Dog City - Additional voices
- Harry and His Bucket Full of Dinosaurs - Lightning
- Freaky Stories - Additional voices
- The Incredible Hulk - Additional voices
- Redwall - Mrs. Churchmouse, Winifred, Sparra
- Tales from the Cryptkeeper - Additional voices
- RoboRoach - Additional voices
- The Adventures of Sam & Max: Freelance Police - Additional voices
- Cadillacs and Dinosaurs - Additional voices
- Medabots - Additional voices
- Birdz - Additional voices
- Blazing Dragons - Additional voices
- Pandalian - Additional voices
- Bakugan Battle Brawlers - Additional voices
- Beyblade - Additional voices
- Flying Rhino Junior High - Additional voices
- Cyberchase - Additional voices
- Hippo Tub Company - Repeatr
- Dumb Bunnies - Voice
- Monster by Mistake - Voice
- Rupert - Additional voices
- Flash Gordon - Additional voices
- What It's Like Being Alone - Voice
- Bedtime Primetime Classics - Voice
- Jacob Two-Two - Voice
- Jane and the Dragon - Voice
- The Neverending Story - Additional voices
- Undergrads - Voice
- Traffix - Voice
- Grossology - Additional voices
- Mischief City - Additional voices
- The Berenstain Bears - Additional voices
- Anatole - Additional voices
- Bob and Margaret - Voice
- Bad Dog - Additional voices
- Diabolik - Additional voices
- Avengers: United They Stand - Additional voices
- Silver Surfer - Additional voices
- Max & Ruby - Additional voices
- Captain Flamingo - Otto, Additional voices
- Moville Mysteries - Additional voices
- Blaster's Universe - Additional voices
- Iggy Arbuckle - Additional voices
- King - Additional voices
- Toot and Puddle - Voice
- Mini-Man - Voice
- Delta State - Voice
- Funpak - Voice
- Spider Riders - Voice
- Turbo Dogs - Auntie Rachett
- Wilbur - Voice
- Little Shop - Voice
- Monster Force - Additional voices
- Di-Gata Defenders - Voice
- Willa's Wild Life - Voice
- Busytown Mysteries - Additional voices
- Gerald McBoing Boing - Voice
- Super Why! - Additional voices
- World of Quest - Additional voices
- Spliced - Additional voices
- Jimmy Two-Shoes - Additional voices
- Franny's Feet - Additional voices
- Bonnie Bear - Bonnie
- Chilly Beach - Additional voices
- Delilah and Julius - Additional voices
- Yin Yang Yo! - Voice
- Magi-Nation - Voice
- The Wumblers - Voice
- Babar and the Adventures of Badou - Miss Strich
- Producing Parker - Tara Moody
- Mysticons - Mrs. Sparklebottom, Alarm
- Thomas & Friends: All Engines Go - Annie (US/UK; 2021–22)
- Thomas & Friends: The Christmas Letter Express - Annie (US)
- Thomas & Friends: Sodor Sings Together - Annie (US)
- X-Men '97 - Valerie Cooper

==== Video games ====
Year	Title	Role	Notes
1994	X-Men: Children of the Atom	Psylocke, Storm, Spiral	
1995	Marvel Super Heroes	Psylocke	
1996	X-Men vs. Street Fighter	Storm	
1999	Resident Evil 3: Nemesis	Jill Valentine	
2000	Marvel vs. Capcom 2: New Age of Heroes	Psylocke, Storm, Spiral, Jill Valentine	
2000	X-Men: Mutant Academy	Jean Grey	
2001	X-Men: Mutant Academy 2	Jean Grey	
