= Matthew Knight =

Canadian actor

- Born: c. 1993 or 1994 (age 32–33)
- Occupation: Actor
- Years active: 2002–2014

External image
- Matthew Knight 2011

Matthew Knight (born c. 1993/1994) is a Canadian former actor known for his roles in Queer as Folk, as Ethan Morgan in My Babysitter's a Vampire, and as Jake Kimble in The Grudge film series. Since then he has appeared in over a dozen television series, more than ten television movies and a number of feature-length and short films. He has been nominated seven times for a Young Artist Award and has won twice, for his performance in Candles on Bay Street (2006) and Gooby (2009).

== Career ==
Knight's first leading role in a feature film was Will Burton in Big Spender (2003). After performing on various television shows, he appeared in Peep (2004 and in The Greatest Game Ever Played (2005) as Young Francis Ouimet. In 2006, he appeared in the werewolf film Skinwalkers. He later appeared in The Grudge 2 (2006) and The Grudge 3 (2009) as Jake Kimble.

Knight later appeared The Good Witch (2008), The Good Witch's Garden (2009), The Good Witch's Gift (2010), The Good Witch's Family (2011) and The Good Witch's Charm (2012). He also starred in the television movie and series My Babysitter's a Vampire. He has starred in the episodes, "Alien Candy" and "Checking Out" of the TV series, R.L. Stine's The Haunting Hour.

== Personal life ==
Knight resided in Mount Albert, Ontario and attended Unionville High School where he was in the performing arts program. He has an older brother, Jack Knight, and sister, Tatum Knight, who are also actors.

== Filmography ==
=== Film ===
Year	Title	Role	Notes
2004	Peep	Harry	Short
2005	The Greatest Game Ever Played	Young Francis Ouimet	
2005	Cheaper by the Dozen 2	Movie Theatre Kid	
2006	The Grudge 2	Jake Kimble	
2007	Christmas in Wonderland	Brian Saunders	
2007	Skinwalkers	Timothy Talbot	
2008	Finn on the Fly	Ben Soledad	
2009	Gooby	Willy	Main role
2009	The Grudge 3	Jake Kimble	
2013	Skating to New York	Jimmy Mundell	

=== Television ===
Year	Title	Role	Notes
2002	Queer as Folk	Peter	Season 2, Episode 9 : "Accentuate the Positive"
2003	1-800-Missing	Peter Melnyk	Season 1, Episode 12: "Victoria"
2003	Big Spender	Will Burton	Television movie
2005	Peep and the Big Wide World	Tom the Cat	Voice role Episode: “Reflection Affection”
2005	Kojak	Paulie Wagner	Season 1, Episodes 5 & 6: "Kind of Blue" and "Hit Man"
2006	Skyland	Spencer	Season 1, Episode 19: "The Secret Power"
2006	For the Love of a Child	Jacob Fletcher	Television movie
2006	Intimate Stranger	Justin Reese	Television movie
2006	Candles on Bay Street	Trooper	Television movie
2007	All the Good Ones Are Married	Luke Gold	Television movie
2007–2008	The Dresden Files	Young Harry Dresden	Episodes: "What About Bob?", "Birds of a Feather"
2008	The Good Witch	Brandon Russell	Television movie
2009	The Good Witch's Garden	Brandon Russell	Television movie
2009	Cartoon Gene	Gene	Lead role
2010	Flashpoint	Isaac	Season 2, Episode 19: "The Farm"
2010	A Heartland Christmas	Sam Hawke	Television movie
2010	The Good Witch's Gift	Brandon Russell	Television movie
2010	My Babysitter's a Vampire	Ethan Morgan	Television movie (backdoor pilot)
2011–2012	My Babysitter's a Vampire	Ethan Morgan	Main role
2011, 2013	R.L. Stine's The Haunting Hour	Greg / Jeremy	Episodes: "Alien Candy", "Checking Out"
2011	The Good Witch's Family	Brandon Russell	Television movie
2012	The Good Witch's Charm	Brandon Russell	Television movie
2013	Magic City	Big Clyde	Episode: "The Sins of the Father"
2013	The Good Witch's Destiny	Brandon Russell	Television movie
2014	The Good Witch's Wonder	Brandon Russell	Television movie

== Awards and nominations ==
Year	Award	Category	Work	Result
2007	Young Artist Award	Best Performance in a TV Movie, Miniseries or Special (Comedy or Drama) – Leading Young Actor	Candles on Bay Street	Won
2009	Young Artist Award	Best Performance in a DVD Film	Christmas in Wonderland	Nominated
2009	Young Artist Award	Best Performance in a TV Movie, Miniseries or Special – Supporting Young Actor	The Good Witch	Nominated
2010	Young Artist Award	Best Performance in a TV Movie, Miniseries or Special – Supporting Young Actor	The Good Witch's Gift	Nominated
2010	Young Artist Award	Best Performance in a DVD Film	Gooby	Won
2012	Young Artist Award	Best Performance in a TV Movie, Miniseries or Special – Supporting Young Actor	The Good Witch's Family	Nominated
2012	Young Artist Award	Best Performance in a TV series – Leading Young Actor	My Babysitter's a Vampire	Nominated
