= Wild Roses (TV series) =

Canadian television drama series

- Genre: Drama
- Written by: Amy Cameron; Matt MacLennan; Graham Clegg; Peter Hume
- Directed by: Michael DeCarlo; Gary Harvey; Don McBrearty; David Sutherland
- Starring: Steve Byers; Adam MacDonald; Kim Huffman; Gary Hudson; Sarah Power; Michelle Harrison; Amy Ciupak Lalonde; Kristen Hager
- Opening theme: "Black Horse and the Cherry Tree"
- Country of origin: Canada
- Original language: English
- No. of seasons: 1
- No. of episodes: 13

Production
- Executive producers: Tom Cox; Jody Randall; Miranda de Pencier
- Producer: Matt MacLennan
- Running time: 44 minutes
- Production companies: SEVEN24 Films; Northwood Entertainment

Original release
- Network: CBC Television
- Release: January 6 – March 31, 2009

Wild Roses is a Canadian drama television series that aired from January 6 to March 31, 2009 on CBC Television. Originally titled Cowgirls, CBC requested the change to Wild Roses after testing the title. The show was officially cancelled by the CBC on April 22, 2009, after only one season.

== Plot ==
The series focuses on the conflict between the McGregors, a family of wealthy oil developers residing on Montrose Ranch, and the Henrys, a widow and her three daughters living in the neighbouring Rivercross Ranch. Prior to the series, Rivercross used to belong to the McGregors, but was given to the Henrys by the now-deceased head of the McGregor family. The current head of the McGregor family, David, resented this decision and wants to take back Rivercross. Shortly before the beginning of the series, David McGregor provided a loan to the Henrys to help them operate their ranch with the promise to repay $10,000 back monthly. As the series begin, the Henrys have defaulted on roughly $60,000 in monthly payments, and David tries to foreclose on the property.

== Main characters ==
=== Henry family ===
- Maggie (Kim Huffman) is the widowed mother of three daughters, who sought the financial aid of her neighbour David McGregor in order to support her family. Maggie is a strong woman, ripe with clear values and morals only impeded by her superficial mother (Kate Trotter).
- Kate (Michelle Harrison), Maggie's oldest daughter, works on the ranch primarily trying to keep Rivercross afloat.
- Lucy (Sarah Power), Maggie's second daughter, assists with the ranch, but has taken on other jobs for the security of a regular paycheck.
- Charlotte (Clare Stone) is Maggie's youngest daughter, and is adopted into the family.

=== McGregor family ===
- David McGregor (Gary Hudson), the CEO and president of McGregor Oil, is a wealthy oil baron who is trying to acquire Rivercross Ranch from the Henrys. He has offered a sizable operating loan to the Henrys but when they could not pay the monthly mortgage, he has intentions to foreclose and take the ranch. He has discovered a vast oil find in the region.
- Will McGregor (Steve Byers), the smart and educated son works with David.
- Peter McGregor (Adam MacDonald) is the complete opposite of Will, effectively the black sheep of the family.
- Rebecca McGregor (Amy Ciupak Lalonde) is the conniving daughter who will quite readily seduce David's business partners to help sway the business in favour of the McGregors. She is currently engaged to Trevor Faulkner (Paul Christie).

=== Other characters ===
- Trevor Faulkner (Paul Christie) is a member of the Alberta Legislative Assembly and fiancé to Rebecca. The relationship between Rebecca and Trevor appears to be one of mutual benefit. In Episode 6, it is discovered that Trevor had a previous homosexual relationship with former university buddy Ethan. Rebecca learns of this and turns a blind eye.
- Dillon Parker (Dylan Neal) is a geologist who has begun dating Maggie. When she finds out that Dillon is David's geologist, Maggie is hesitant but continues the relationship, only to discover that he later disappears. (Episodes 1-6)

== Production ==
The show is primarily shot at The Window Studio as well as on location in Calgary, Alberta, and surrounding areas within a one-hour drive such as Bragg Creek and Bearspaw.

- McGregor Oil, The Henry Home and Crossbar Ranch (interior) scenes are filmed at The Window Studio in Calgary. The McGregor Ranch is shot at a home located in the rural community of Bearspaw, northwest of Calgary.
- The Broken Shoulder restaurant is located in Bragg Creek.

Common shooting locations around Calgary include Stephen Avenue, Inglewood, Bankers Hall Towers and numerous locations in the downtown core. One of the major shots commonly seen in the series is the overlooking Rocky Mountains and rolling foothills, a signature landscape associated with Calgary.

=== Opening theme ===
The opening theme song is Scottish singer KT Tunstall. "Black Horse and the Cherry Tree" was a hit single and released in February 2005. The song was also featured on Tunstall's album Eye to the Telescope, and also on American Idol (Season 5).

Scenes shown in the opening sequence feature various locations within Calgary and its skyline. Watermarked in the sequence is the family trees of the McGregors and the Henrys.

==== Symbolism ====
The sequence is key to show the two-way spectrum of Good and Evil between the two families.

- Henrys represent the "Good", white, wholesome, do-gooder
- McGregors represent the "Bad", black, greed, opportunistic

At the end of the sequence this is visible among a large table, McGregors on the right side dressed in black, and dining in what appears to be a catered event. On the opposite end of the table, the Henrys dressed in white and dining in what appears to be a casual and more wholesome event. This is the epitome of the series and the basis of which these two families rest their principles upon.

== Episodes ==
No.	Title	Original release date	Prod. code	CAN viewers (millions)
1	"Cowgirls"	January 6, 2009	1-01	0.627
Suspecting that oil might be found on the neighbouring Rivercross ranch, David McGregor attempts to seize the property by foreclosing on a personal loan made to the Henry family.
2	"Sisters and Brothers"	January 13, 2009	1-02	0.453
Charlotte tries to blackmail Rebecca McGregor, who has been cheating on her fiancé, into getting her father to leave Rivercross alone. Meanwhile, Maggie Henry sells treasured possessions in an attempt to make the monthly loan payment and meets Dillon, an attractive geologist employed by David.
3	"Friends and Rivals"	January 20, 2009	1-03	0.467
In the hopes of winning a cash prize to keep the ranch afloat, Kate Henry trains for the rodeo with the help of Peter McGregor, who has been ordered by his father to instead concentrate on helping the daughter of a potential business partner who has also entered the competition.
4	"Booms and Echoes"	January 27, 2009	1-04	0.550
To give Dillon time to secretly test Rivercross for oil, David pressures Maggie into attending an environmental fundraiser gala to make a speech in return for a generous donation to the cause. Unable to balance waitressing and ranch work, Lucy hires mysterious new farmhand Briggs, who is willing to work for room and board.
5	"Secrets and Lies"	February 3, 2009	1-05	N/A
When their tractor breaks down, Kate discovers that David has been spreading rumours about the family financial situation around town, destroying their ability to get credit to fix or replace it. Injured doing repairs, Briggs reluctantly reveals his dodgy past to the Henrys, and Dillon is tempted to keep the discovery of oil under Rivercross from Maggie, to whom he has been growing increasingly attached.
6	"Oil and Water"	February 10, 2009	1-06	0.404
After a dinner party at the McGregors', Rebecca makes an unwanted discovery about fiancé Trevor, and David finds out that Dillon has decided to tell Maggie. Charlotte is grounded after a drunken house party during which she meets Jude, a young activist.
7	"Love and Loss"	February 17, 2009	1-07	0.420
Increasingly paranoid due to his new coke habit, Peter goes on a jealous rampage and is hit by a car. Meanwhile, Maggie worries that something has happened to Dillon after he fails to show up for their planned date.
8	"Sin and Redemption"	February 24, 2009	1-08	0.516
When a body is found in the nearby creek, Rebecca's attempts to divert suspicion from her father only increase Maggie's conviction that David had something to do the death. Charlotte sneaks out to spend time with Jude, culminating in an SUV-vandalizing spree.
9	"Meat and Potatoes"	March 3, 2009	1-09	0.432
Released from hospital, Peter accepts an invitation to stay at Rivercross. Meanwhile, Kate and Maggie search for the missing Briggs, and Will uncovers unsettling information about his father, whose business associates have begun to pressure him to deliver the oil he promised.
10	"Boom and Bust"	March 10, 2009	1-10	N/A
Finding out about the potential oil under their property tears the Henry family apart as they disagree on whether or not to drill. Lucy has trouble finding investors willing to fund exploration and a guilt-stricken Will is torn between her and his family as David and Rebecca scheme to gain control.
11	"Hunters and Gatherers"	March 17, 2009	1-11	0.456
The threat of a killer wolf loose on their neighbouring ranches brings David and Kate together to deal with the danger to their herds. Meanwhile, Rebecca tries to find out who's been funding the new test drilling on Rivercross and Charlotte's biological mother shows up unexpectedly.
12	"Time and Chance"	March 24, 2009	1-12	0.414
Peter finds a way for the ranch to potentially pay for itself without resorting to drilling, resulting in a rift between Kate, who wants to preserve their land, and Lucy, who wants to partner with the newly-unemployed Will, who has been fired by his enraged father David. Rebecca does damage control after a past indiscretion threatens Trevor's political campaign and realizes that her oil connections might prove a liability to his independent standing.
13	"First and Last"	March 31, 2009	1-13	0.413
Lucy's former boyfriend Jones returns for a visit, provoking jealousy from Will, who is already concerned about their increasing expenditures with no oil in sight. With her wedding coming up, Rebecca takes steps to distance herself and Trevor from her family's business reputation, which David views as yet another betrayal. Meanwhile, Charlotte looks into the identity of her previously unknown birth father even as she fends off the persistent attentions of Jude, who has a more sinister plan in mind than simply making up with her.
