= Sarah Power =

Canadian actress

- Born: St. John's, Newfoundland and Labrador, Canada
- Occupation: Actress
- Years active: 2002–present
- Spouse: Peter Mooney (m. 2017)
- Children: 1

Sarah Power (born c. June 29, 1983) is a Canadian actress. She is known for her role as Lucy Henry on the CBC Television series Wild Roses, and for her recurring roles on the television series Good Witch, Killjoys, and American Gothic.

== Personal life ==
Power was born in St. John's, Newfoundland and Labrador. She danced in her youth and started acting lessons at 14. In 2001, she moved to Toronto to begin an acting career. She attended Ryerson University's Theatre School to study the arts.

Power married Peter Mooney, an actor and producer, in 2017, and they have a daughter, born in May 2019.

== Career ==
At age 16, Power was cast in the 2002 television miniseries based on the novel Random Passage. In 2009 she was cast in a main role on the CBC Television series Wild Roses, playing Lucy, the middle daughter in the Henry family on the series. Her film credits include Saw V (as Angelina Hoffman), Repo! The Genetic Opera (as Marni Wallace) and American Pie Presents: Beta House (as Denise).

In 2011, Power appeared in the Hallmark Channel television film The Good Witch's Family, and on the follow-up 2015 television series Good Witch, in the recurring role of Abigail; she later became a full time regular with the series. Also in 2015 she began appearing in the recurring role of Doctor Pawter Simms on the Space channel television series Killjoys. In 2016 Power appeared in the recurring role of Jennifer Windham on the CBS television series American Gothic.

== Filmography ==
=== Film ===
Year	Title	Role	Notes
2007	American Pie Presents: Beta House	Denise	Direct-to-video
2008	Repo! The Genetic Opera	Marni	
2008	Saw V	Angelina	
2015	I Lived	Greta	
2015	The Hexecutioners	Olivia Bletcher	
2022	The Christmas Checklist	Emily	

=== Television ===
Year	Title	Role	Notes
2002	Random Passage	Fanny	Television miniseries
2007	The Best Years	Bubbly Girl	Episode: "From Here to Eternity"
2009	The Listener	Mina Delia Croce	Episode: "Some Kinda Love"
2009	Wild Roses	Lucy Henry	Main role
2010	Lost Girl	Siobhan the Banshee	Episode: "Fae Day"
2010–2014	Republic of Doyle	Crystal Maher	3 episodes
2011	Murdoch Mysteries	Clara Thorn	Episode: "Downstairs, Upstairs"
2011	The Good Witch's Family	Abigail Pershing	Television film
2012	Californication	The Girl	Episode: "At the Movies"
2013	Time of Death	Megan Welles	Television film
2015–2016, 2018	Killjoys	Illenore Pawter Seyah Simms	Recurring role (seasons 1–2, 4); 15 episodes
2015–2021	Good Witch	Abigail Pershing	Recurring role (season 1); main role (seasons 2–7)
2016–2017	Schitt's Creek	Tennessee	Episodes: "Happy Anniversary", "Opening Night"
2016	American Gothic	Jennifer Windham	Recurring role; 5 episodes
2017	Rosewood	Evie Howler	Episode: "Radiation & Rough Landings"
2017	Designated Survivor	Julie Keenan	Episode: "Home"
2021	Nantucket Noel	Christina Antonioni	Hallmark Movie
2022	Our Italian Christmas Memories	Anna Collucia	Hallmark Movie
2023	Accused	Ashley Krause	Episode: Jiro’s Story
2024	Love On The Danube: Kissing Stars	Savannah Bailey	Hallmark Movie
