= Finn on the Fly =

- Theatrical release poster
- Directed by: Mark Jean
- Written by: Michael Souther; Teza Lawrence; Kellie Ann Benz
- Starring: Ana Gasteyer; Ryan Belleville; Matthew Knight
- Music by: Jeff Danna
- Production companies: Amaze Film + Television; E1 Entertainment; Finn Prairie Productions; Stephen Onda Productions
- Distributed by: E1 Entertainment
- Release dates: January 25, 2008 (Canada); February 6, 2009 (United States)
- Running time: 101 min
- Country: Canada
- Language: English

Finn on the Fly is 2008 Canadian film that was directed by Mark Jean. The Canadian comedian Ryan Belleville plays the part of Finn as a human.

== Plot ==
In the film, Dr. Madsen, a bitter, fame-hungry mad scientist (Ana Gasteyer), turns a Boy named Ben's dog, Finn, into a human (Ryan Belleville), when Finn accidentally runs into her lab. Ben trains Finn on how to act like a human, while Dr. Madsen wants to capture Finn for personal gain.

== Cast ==
- Ryan Belleville as Finn
  - Eddie the Dog as Finn the Dog
- Matthew Knight as Ben Soledad, Finn's owner
- Ana Gasteyer as Dr. Madeline Madsen
- Brandon Firla as Bob, Madeline's assistant
- Wendy Anderson as Grace Soledad, Ben's mother
- Juan Chioran as Pablo Reyes, Ben's stepfather
- David Milchard as Eddie Reyes, Ben's paternal step-cousin
- Aislinn Paul as Chloe, Ben's love interest
- Mathew Peart as Al Madsen, Madeline's son and Ben's neighbor and bully later best friend
- Vivien Endicott Douglas as Ashley, Ben's best friend
- Cameron Ansell as Nelson, Ben's best friend
- Shannon Anderson as Ruby, Ben's best friend and Nelson's love interest
- Kristian Ferguson as Ralph, Ben's best friend

== Home media ==
Special features on the DVD are behind the scenes and a short comic. The film was released in the 2 DVD set Dog Tails Collection along with A Dog of Flanders, A Dog's Tale, and Sounder.

== Reception ==
Common Sense Media gave the film a positive review.
