= Catherine Bell =

British actress (born 1968)

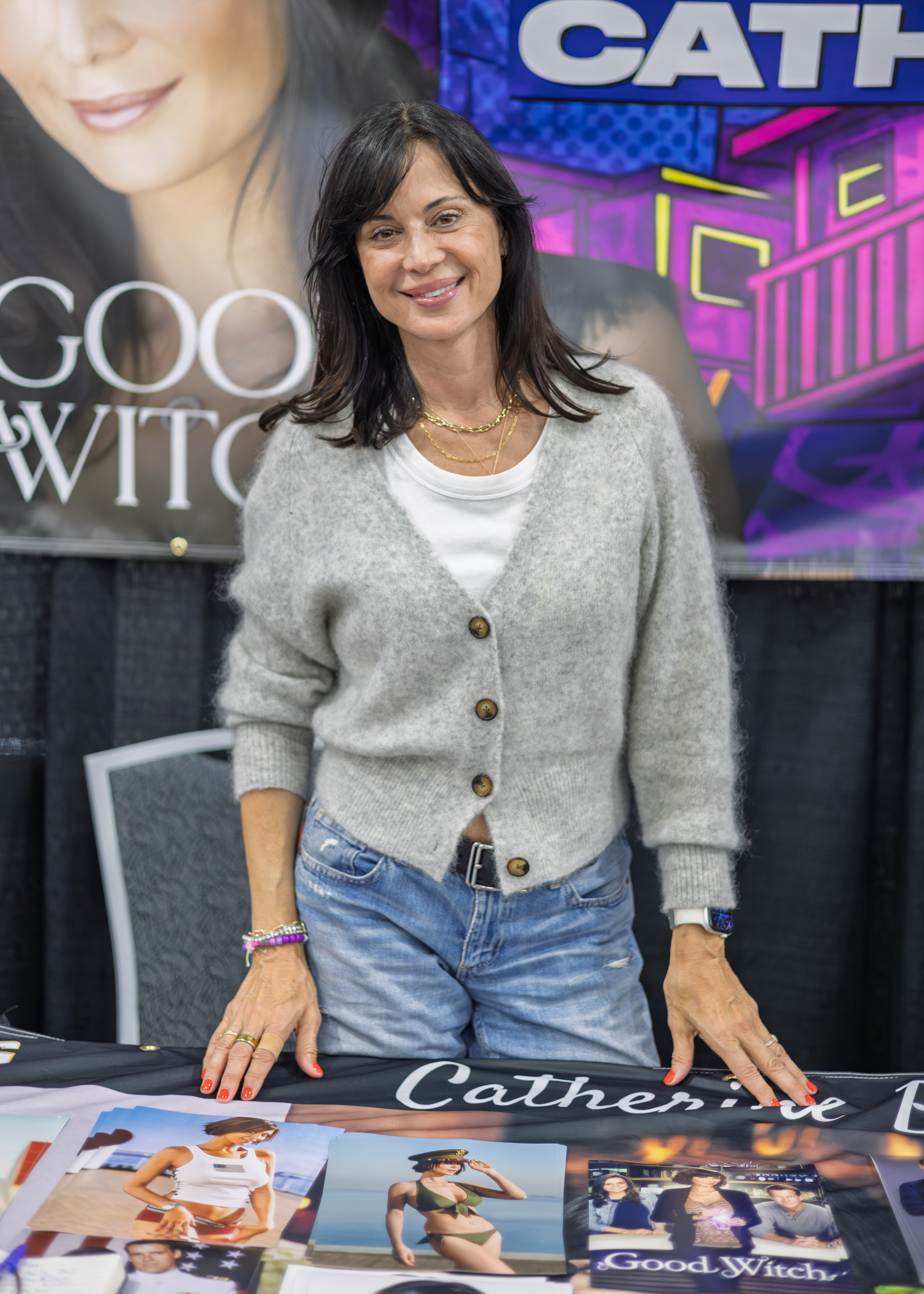
- Bell at Fandomcon in 2026
- Born: Catherine Lisa Bell; 14 August 1968 (age 57); London, England
- Citizenship: British, American
- Occupations: Actress; model
- Years active: 1991–present
- Known for: JAG; The Good Witch; Army Wives
- Spouse: Adam Beason (m. 1994; div. 2011)
- Partner: Brooke Daniells (2012–present)
- Children: 2
- Website: www.catherinebell.com

Catherine Lisa Bell (born 14 August 1968) is a British and American actress known for her roles as Lieutenant Colonel Sarah MacKenzie in the television series JAG from 1997 to 2005, Denise Sherwood in the series Army Wives from 2007 to 2013, and Cassandra "Cassie" Nightingale in Hallmark's The Good Witch films and television series from 2008 to 2021.

== Early life ==
Catherine Lisa Bell was born on 14 August 1968 in London to a Scottish father, Peter Bell, and an Iranian mother, Mina Ezzati. Peter was working as an architect under contract to an oil company in Iran; Mina had travelled to London to study nursing. Bell's parents divorced when Catherine was two years old. She was raised by her mother and maternal grandparents. The family eventually moved to California's San Fernando Valley where Bell was exposed to diverse influences. The family spoke Persian at home. In her teenage years, Catherine came under the influence of her California surroundings: "I am definitely a Valley Girl. I was a tomboy. I liked to skateboard, play football, and push the envelope a little bit". Bell enrolled at UCLA, where she considered a career in medicine or research. However, when she was offered a modelling job in Japan, where advertisers value "American beauty", she dropped out during her second year.

== Career ==
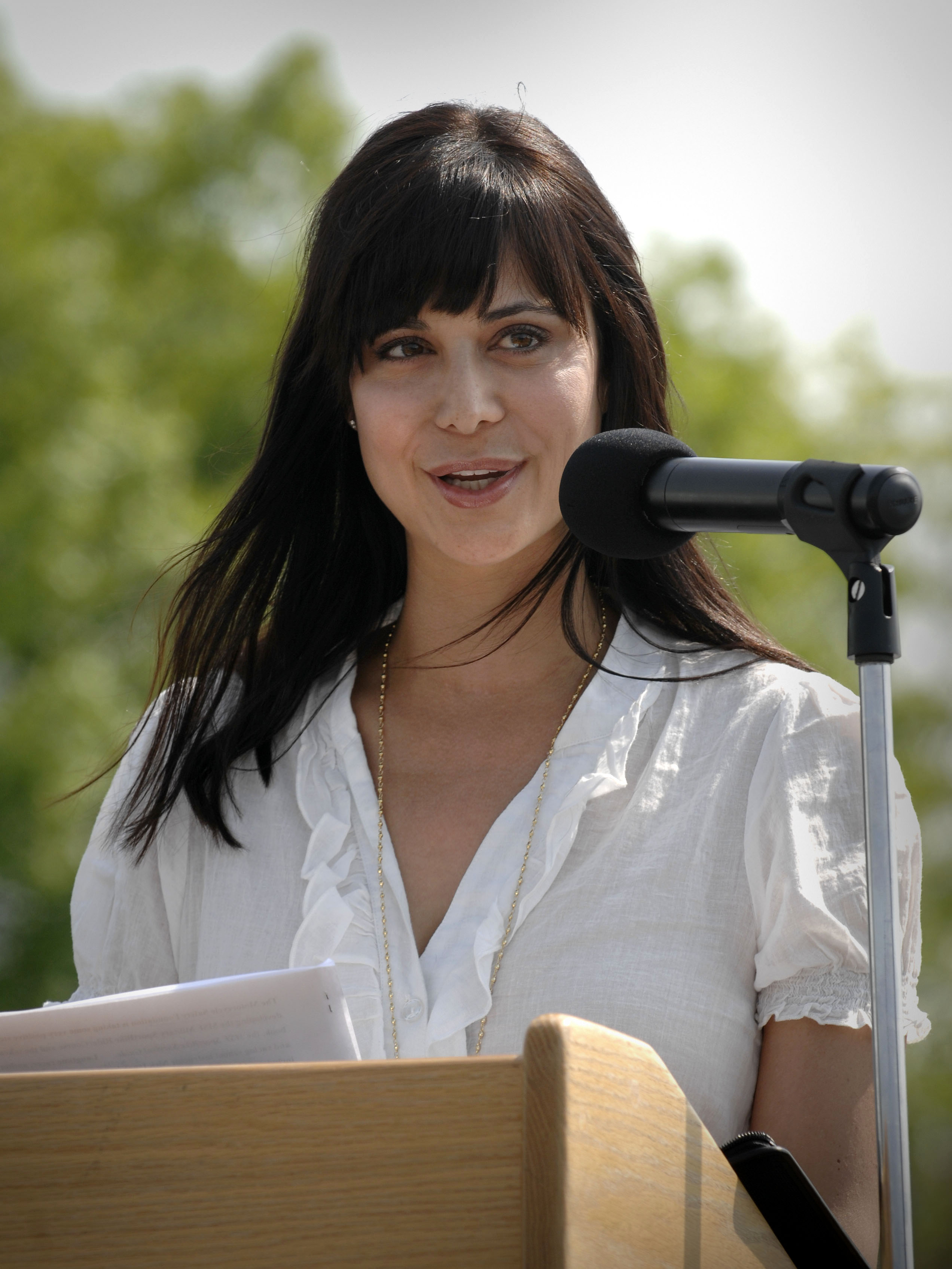
Bell at The Pentagon in 2008

When Bell returned to the United States, she decided to try acting. She studied at the Beverly Hills Playhouse with Milton Katselas. She also worked as a massage therapist for eight years at the Peninsula Hotel, and her clients included singer Peter Gabriel. Bell's first television acting role was one line spoken to Gabriel on the short-lived 1990 sitcom Sugar and Spice.

Among her first parts was Isabella Rossellini's body double for the 1992 film Death Becomes Her.

In 1994, Bell starred in the Dolph Lundgren film Men of War. While filming the movie in Thailand, Bell and her co-star Trevor Goddard bonded over contracting amoebic dysentery. Goddard would play Bell's off-and-on love interest Mic Brumby a few years later, on JAG. They remained friends until Goddard's death from a drug overdose in June 2003, an event that the bereaved Bell described as "horrible".

In 1995, she obtained a three-line role in one episode of the NBC TV series JAG, which centers on the work of the United States Department of the Navy's Judge Advocate General office. NBC canceled the show after which it was picked up by CBS, which restructured the series, incorporating a female Marine Corps lawyer character, Sarah MacKenzie. Bell auditioned for that role and won it. She continued in this role until the series ended in 2005.

Beginning in 2007, Bell starred in Lifetime's ensemble drama series Army Wives as Denise Sherwood, the wife of a U.S. Army lieutenant colonel, who endures domestic violence at the hands of her teenage son during the show's first season.

Bell played the role of Cassandra "Cassie" Nightingale, the main character of Hallmark's The Good Witch (2008), and its sequels The Good Witch's Garden (2009), The Good Witch's Gift (2010), The Good Witch's Family (2011), The Good Witch's Charm (2012), The Good Witch's Destiny (2013), and The Good Witch's Wonder (2014). She was also a co-executive producer of all of the movies. She also starred in the Lifetime movie titled Last Man Standing (2011).

In 2015, it was reported that Bell would star in the movie Love Finds Its Way, which would begin filming in 2016. Production began on the film in March 2017, with Vancouver as the filming location, and 9 July 2017 as the date for the film's premiere on the Hallmark Channel.

On 2 April 2019, CBS announced that Bell would be reprising her JAG role of Sarah "Mac" MacKenzie alongside former co-star David James Elliott for a multi-episode arc in the tenth season of NCIS: Los Angeles.

In 2022, Bell starred in the Lifetime film Jailbreak Lovers as part of its "Ripped from the Headlines" feature film which tells the story of how Toby Dorr snuck inmate John Manard out of prison in a dog crate which sparked a manhunt.

== Personal life ==
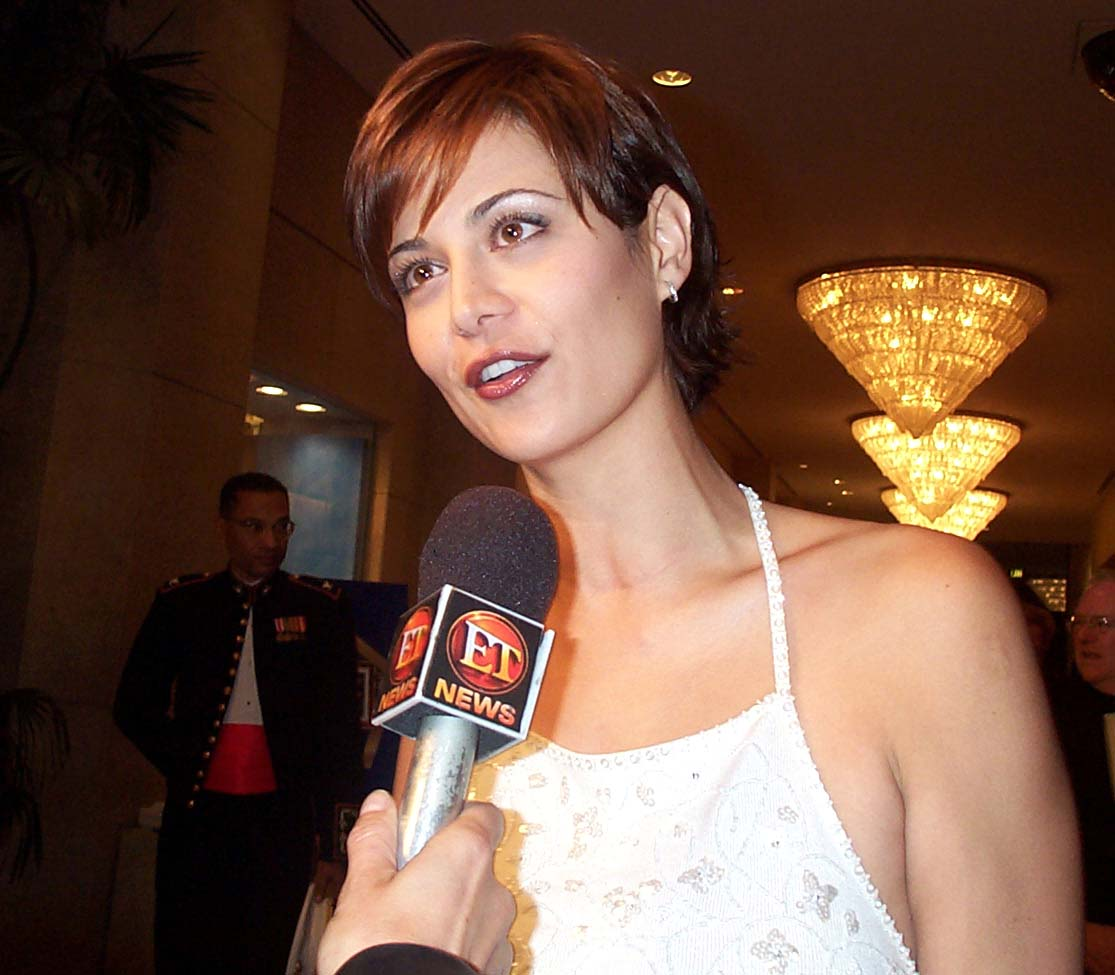
Bell at military concert at The Beverly Hilton in Beverly Hills, California in 2000

Bell is fluent in Persian and English. She is fond of motorcycling, skiing, snowboarding and kickboxing. Her hobbies include cross-stitching and making model cars, which she has done since age eight.

During the 2007–2008 Writers Guild of America strike, Bell took flying lessons in a Cirrus SR22.

Bell met actor-production assistant Adam Beason on the set of the 1992 film Death Becomes Her. They were married on 8 May 1994. They are the parents of two children. They lived in a nearly 5,700 square feet (530 m^{2}) faux-Tuscan-style mini-mansion in Calabasas, California. The couple sold the house in 2010 and publicly confirmed that they had separated sometime before September 2011. They eventually divorced in 2011.

Since 2012, Bell has lived with fellow Scientologist, photographer and party planner Brooke Daniells, together with their children, in Los Angeles. In 2014, Bell paid US$2.05 million for a single-story ranch house on a 1.2 acres (0.49 ha) lot in the gated Hidden Hills community in the western suburbs of Los Angeles. She later moved to Clearwater Beach, Florida.

=== Scientology ===
Bell was raised Roman Catholic and attended an all-girls Catholic school (Our Lady of Corvallis High School in Los Angeles). She is a practicing Scientologist. Bell has attested to attaining the Scientology state of Clear. She has supported Scientology's Hollywood Education and Literacy Project. In December 2005, Bell helped promote the gala opening of the "Psychiatry: An Industry of Death" museum of the Citizens Commission on Human Rights (a Scientology supported group). In February 2006, Bell appeared in a Scientology music video called "United".

== Filmography ==
=== Film ===
Year	Title	Role	Notes
1992	Death Becomes Her	Lisle's Body Double	
1994	Men of War	Grace Lashield	
1996	Crash Dive	Lt. Cmdr. Lisa Stark	
1998	Black Thunder	Lisa	
2003	Bruce Almighty	Susan Ortega	
2005	Babak and Friends: A First Norooz	Layla (voice)	
2007	Evan Almighty	Susan Ortega	Uncredited
2016	The Bandit Hound	Joanne	
2016	The Do-Over	Dawn DiFazio	

=== Television ===
Year	Title	Role	Notes
1991	True Colors	Donna	Episode: "Brotherly Love"
1993	Mother of the Bride	Chastity	Television film
1994	Dream On	Kay Meadows	Episode: "Those Who Can't, Edit"
1995	Vanishing Son	Kelly / Rachel	Episodes "Miracle Under 34th Street" and "Long Ago and Far Away"
1995	Alien Nation: Body and Soul	Cop	Television film
1995	Friends	Robin	Episode: "The One with the Baby on the Bus"
1995	The Naked Truth	Dylan's Mistress	Episode: "Comet Nails Star and Vice Versa!"
1996	JAG	LTJG Diane Schonke	Season 1/Episode 22: "Skeleton Crew" "We the People" (1997) (archive footage) "Death Watch" (1998) (archive footage)
1996–2005	JAG	Maj./Lt. Col. Sarah MacKenzie	Main role (season 2–10); As Jenny Lake, episode: "Ghosts of Christmas Past" (1999); As Mrs. Alexander Mackenzie, episode: "Mutiny" (2001); As Ensign Beverly Tromatore, episode: "Each of Us Angels" (2003)
1996	Hot Line	Cat	Episode: "The Brunch Club"
1997	Hercules: The Legendary Journeys	Cynea	Episode: "The Lady and the Dragon"
1998–1999	Penn & Teller's Sin City Spectacular	Herself	2 episodes
1998	Cab to Canada	Sandy	Television film
1999	Thrill Seekers	Elizabeth Wintern	Television film
2003	Waking the Dead	Sam James	Episode: "Final Cut"
2005	The Triangle	Emily Patterson	Miniseries
2006	Company Town	Maggie Shaunessy	Unaired pilot
2006	Threshold	Dr. Daphne Larson	Episode: "Outbreak"
2006	Law & Order: Special Victims Unit	Naomi Cheales	Episode: "Choreographed"
2007	Still Small Voices	Michael Summer	Television film
2007–2013	Army Wives	Denise Sherwood	Main role
2008	The Good Witch	Cassandra "Cassie" Nightingale	Television film; leading role and co-executive producer
2009	The Good Witch's Garden	Cassandra "Cassie" Nightingale	Television film; leading role and co-executive producer
2010	The Good Witch's Gift	Cassandra "Cassie" Nightingale	Television film; leading role and co-executive producer
2011	Last Man Standing	Abby Collins	Television film; leading role and producer
2011	The Good Witch's Family	Cassandra "Cassie" Nightingale	Television film; leading role and co-executive producer
2011	Good Morning, Killer	FBI Special Agent Ana Gray	Television film; leading role; shown as part of TNT's Mystery Movie Night series
2012	The Good Witch's Charm	Cassandra "Cassie" Nightingale	Television film; leading role and co-executive producer
2013	King & Maxwell	Joan Dillinger	2 episodes
2013	The Good Witch's Destiny	Cassandra "Cassie" Nightingale	Television film; leading role and co-executive producer
2014	The Good Witch's Wonder	Cassandra "Cassie" Nightingale	Television film; leading role and co-executive producer
2015–2021	Good Witch	Cassandra "Cassie" Nightingale	Leading role and co-executive producer
2017	Home for Christmas Day	Jane McKendrick	Television film; leading role and executive producer
2017	High-Rise Rescue	Beth Davis	Television film; leading role and executive producer
2017	Christmas in the Air	Lydia Evans	Television film; leading role and co-executive producer
2018	A Summer to Remember	Jessica Tucker	Television film; leading role and executive producer
2019–2020	NCIS: Los Angeles	Lt. Col. Sarah MacKenzie	Recurring role; 3 episodes; original main character from JAG
2020	Meet Me at Christmas	Joan	Television film
2022	Jailbreak Lovers	Toby	Television film
2023	Christmas on Cherry Lane	Regina	Television film
2024	Happy Holidays From Cherry Lane	Regina	Television film

== See also ==
- Agra catbellae – A species of beetle named after Catherine Bell
- List of Iranian actresses
