= The Good Witch's Garden =

- Based on: Characters by Rod Spence
- Written by: G. Ross Parker
- Directed by: Craig Pryce
- Starring: Catherine Bell; Chris Potter; Catherine Disher; Peter MacNeill; Rob Stewart; Matthew Knight; Elizabeth Lennie; Hannah Endicott-Douglas
- Composer: Jack Lenz
- Countries of origin: Canada; United States
- Original language: English

Production
- Executive producers: Orly Adelson; Jonathan Eskenas; Frank Siracusa
- Producer: Andrea Raffaghello
- Cinematography: John Dyer
- Editor: Mark Sanders
- Running time: 120 minutes
- Production companies: Whizbang Films; Lee Distribution

Original release
- Network: Hallmark Channel
- Release: February 7, 2009

Related
- The Good Witch; The Good Witch's Gift; Good Witch

The Good Witch's Garden is a Hallmark Channel television film, the sequel to The Good Witch. It premiered on Hallmark Channel on February 7, 2009.

== Plot ==
Cassie Nightingale (Catherine Bell) has settled into Middleton and is busy making Grey House into a bed and breakfast. Her boyfriend, Chief of Police Jake Russell (Chris Potter), and his kids, Brandon (Matthew Knight) and Lori (Hannah Endicott-Douglas), are happy to have Cassie in the neighborhood, but before long, a stranger named Nick (Rob Stewart) appears. He knows more than he should and uses his charms to gain Martha Tinsdale and the rest of the city council's trust. He reveals himself to be the sole heir of the Grey Lady's lover, the actual owner of Grey House. The Lady appears to have simply taken the house after his mysterious disappearance. Papers prove this entitlement to legal ownership, yet Jake Russell is suspicious and eager to help a bewildered Cassie. Cassie hands over the house and later finds it for sale in a newspaper ad.

On a history project for school, Lori is partnered with a girl who keeps running off whenever they meet to work on it. The girl later reveals she is illiterate. With Lori's support, she gets help and the two of them find a way to work together.

While researching in the library, Lori stumbles upon a book. The book cover appears empty at first, but soon letters appear revealing it to be a collection of fictional stories written by the Grey Lady. All stories revolve around a certain captain, who had been believed to be her lover and who Nick claims to be related to. However, as the book confirms, he was merely a fictional character made real over time by the people of Middleton. Jake arrests Nick after discovering the man is using one of many fake identities taken on to con rightful owners out of their properties.

The movie ends with a garden party held at Cassie's, where Martha Tisdale finally accepts her as a valuable member of the community. Under the lights of fireworks, Jake proposes to Cassie and she accepts.

== Cast and characters ==
- Catherine Bell as Cassandra "Cassie" Nightingale.
- Chris Potter as Chief of Police Jake Russell.
- Catherine Disher as Councilor Martha Tinsdale.
- Peter MacNeill as George O'Hanrahan, the father of Jake's late wife.
- Rob Stewart as Nick Chasen.
- Matthew Knight as Brandon Russell.
- Elizabeth Lennie as Gwen
- Hannah Endicott-Douglas as Lori Russell.
- Noah Cappe as Deputy Derek Sanders.
- Paul Miller as Tom Tinsdale, Mayor of Middleton and Martha's husband.

== Working title ==
The film was originally to be titled Good Witch 2: Magic Never Fades.

== Reception ==
The film's premiere did moderately well for Hallmark Channel. It scored a 2.7 household rating with over 2.3 million homes, over 3.1 million total viewers and 4.2 million unduplicated viewers. This performance ranked it #1 in the time period as well as the second-highest-rated Prime Time cable movie of the week and day, among all ad-supported cable networks. The film boosted Hallmark Channel to rank #3 in Prime Time for the day, and #5 for the week.

Dove.org declared the film approved for all ages, saying "It is comical at times and serious at others, but truly entertaining."
