= The Good Witch's Family =

- Based on: Characters by Rod Spence
- Written by: G. Ross Parker
- Directed by: Craig Pryce
- Starring: Catherine Bell; Chris Potter; Catherine Disher; Sarah Power; Hannah Endicott-Douglas; Matthew Knight; Rhys Ward
- Composers: Jack Lenz; Orest Hrynewich
- Countries of origin: Canada; United States
- Original language: English

Production
- Executive producers: Orly Adelson; Jonathan Eskenas; Frank Siracusa
- Producer: Thom J. Pretak
- Cinematography: John Berrie
- Editor: Dona Noga
- Running time: 83 minutes
- Production companies: Whizbang Films; Lee Distribution

Original release
- Network: Hallmark Channel
- Release: October 29, 2011

Related
- The Good Witch's Gift; The Good Witch's Charm; Good Witch

The Good Witch's Family is a 2011 Canadian/American family film and Hallmark Channel original movie written by G. Ross Parker and directed by Craig Pryce, The film stars Catherine Bell, Chris Potter, Catherine Disher, Matthew Knight, and Paul Miller. Family is the fourth film in the Good Witch film series. The film premiered on Hallmark Channel October 29, 2011. The first film premiered January 19, 2008.

== Plot ==
Cassie Nightingale (Catherine Bell) lives in the small town of Middleton with her husband, police chief Jake Russell (Chris Potter), and Brandon (Matthew Knight) and Lori (Hannah Endicott-Douglas), his children by an earlier marriage.

Her first cousin, Abigail (Sarah Power), gets evicted from her home. Cassie has never met Abigail, but, connecting with her through the internet, invites her to visit. At the police station, Jake speaks with Mayor Tom Tinsdale (Paul Miller) and learns that the mayor is supporting a project to build a bridge which would connect Middleton to its neighboring city, and that the Mayor's wife, Martha (Catherine Disher), is leading support against the construction. At the opposition meeting, Cassie is nominated to run for mayor, and asks Martha to run her campaign. When she later tells Jake her news, he does not tell her that the mayor and his wife are at odds.

Back at home, as Cassie tells Lori that she is planning Lori's Sweet 16 birthday party, Abigail arrives for her visit. Later, Jake's deputy Derek Sanders (Noah Cappe) meets Abigail and Derek tells her that he agrees with the mayor about the bridge's benefit to the town. When back at Cassie's, Abigail tells Jake she is completely against the bridge, and hopes Cassie wins the election so she can put a stop to it. The following day, Derek tells Cassie and Jake that he has himself decided to run for mayor and Cassie learns that she and Jake have differing views on the subject. In the meantime, Abigail has given Lori a love potion to use to gain the affections of Brandon's friend Wes (Rhys Ward), and Brandon is unhappy that his friend Wes is so distracted. Abigail seems to be reveling in the chaos she has caused, and Cassie figures it out. Jake is fired when Derek's campaign speech is stolen, as he disagrees with the mayor's position and is the prime suspect. Abigail plots spells upon the family with the use of voodoo dolls.

Lori sneaks out after curfew to be with Wes, but he abandons her. Angry, Brandon cuts ties with him. Martha Tinsdale arrives seeking a place to stay, announcing that she and her husband have split over the bridge issue. Despite the growing family tensions, Jake and Cassie talk over breakfast, trying to stay strong despite Jake's job loss. Brandon tells Lori he has cut ties with Wes over Wes's actions. Looking for her later, Cassie finds Abigail missing. When overhearing the family being so supportive, Abigail grew frustrated that her scheme of sowing disharmony had deteriorated and left. Derek tracks Abigail down in a newly rented apartment. Cassie soon also arrives and comforts Abigail. Realizing the error of her ways, Abigail apologizes for causing problems.

When it is revealed the bridge developers will build a new mall across the river, destroying a nearby wooded area and harming the downtown business economy, Cassie gives an impassioned speech and Derek drops out of the mayoral race. Cassie is elected mayor and Jake is re-hired as chief of police. When Jake later speaks about growing their family, Cassie reveals she is pregnant.

== Cast ==
- Catherine Bell as Cassandra "Cassie" Nightingale
- Chris Potter as Chief Jake Russell
- Catherine Disher as Martha Tinsdale
- Sarah Power as Abigail Pershing
- Hannah Endicott-Douglas as Lori Russell
- Matthew Knight as Brandon Russell
- Rhys Ward as Wes Maneri
- Noah Cappe as Deputy Derek Sanders
- Paul Miller as Mayor Tom Tinsdale
- Karen Ivany as Citizen Jeannie

== Release ==
The film had international airings under different names. It aired in Spain as El hechizo de la dama gris (The spell of the Lady Grey), in Italy as Una nuova vita per Cassie (A new life for Cassie), and in France as Le jardin des merveilles and Un mariage féerique. Though released in the United States on October 29, 2011, it aired on August 5 2011 in the United Kingdom and on October 16, 2011 in Spain. Following US airings, it aired in Italy in December 2011 and in Belgium in February 2012.

== Recognition ==
=== Reception ===
The Oklahoman remarked that in her recurring role of Casandra Nightingale in The Good Witch film series, it is "no stretch to say Catherine Bell has cast a spell over viewers." When Bell signed for the fifth in the series, the fourth was just entering production.

Kevin McDonough, the reviewer at South Coast Today, admitted to being "vaguely fascinated by the Good Witch movies" and the lead character of Cassandra Nightingale, and being "bowled over by their banality." He made special note of the film series' plots being predictable and the dialogue having a "false soap-opera quality", and being intrigued by Catherine Bell's approach to acting, writing, "If she were any more placid, she'd be in a coma." McDonough did grant that as the fourth in the series, the plot did include some complications, but complained in his review that "as always, the plots to these movies don't really matter as much as the exasperating unexcitability of Cassie." He concluded that the film seemed "adapted from some comic book called 'Sabrina, the Medicated Witch.'"

=== Awards and nominations ===
Matthew Knight received a 2012 Young Artist Awards nomination for "Best Performance in a TV Movie, Miniseries or Special - Supporting Young Actor" for his role as Brandon Russell.
