= The Good Witch's Destiny =

- Genre: Fantasy drama
- Based on: Characters by Rod Spence
- Written by: Annie Young Frisbie
- Directed by: Craig Pryce
- Starring: Catherine Bell; Chris Potter; Hannah Endicott-Douglas; Matthew Knight; Peter MacNeill; Catherine Disher; Robin Dunne; Elizabeth Lennie
- Composers: Jack Lenz; Orest Hrynewich
- Countries of origin: Canada; United States
- Original language: English

Production
- Executive producers: Orly Adelson; Jonathan Eskenas; Frank Siracusa
- Producer: Manny Danelon
- Cinematography: John Berrie
- Editor: Kathy Weinkauf
- Running time: 82 minutes
- Production companies: Whizbang Films; Lee Distribution

Original release
- Network: Hallmark Channel
- Release: October 26, 2013

Related
- The Good Witch's Charm; The Good Witch's Wonder; Good Witch

The Good Witch's Destiny is a 2013 Canadian-American television film and Hallmark Channel original movie written by Annie Young Frisbie and directed by Craig Pryce. The film stars Catherine Bell, Chris Potter, Hannah Endicott-Douglas, Matthew Knight, Peter MacNeill, Catherine Disher, Robin Dunne, and Elizabeth Lennie. Destiny is the sixth film in the Good Witch film series. The film premiered on Hallmark Channel October 26, 2013.

== Plot ==
Cassie Nightingale's (Catherine Bell) birthday is drawing nearer. She tells her husband, Middleton Police Chief Jake Russell (Chris Potter), that she wants a party with all her friends and family attending. Jake's grown children, Brandon (Matthew Knight) and Lori (Hannah Endicott-Douglas), will both graduate soon, and Cassie believes this to be the last time everyone will be together.

Jake's father-in-law, George (Peter MacNeill), and George's new wife, Gwen (Elizabeth Lennie), wish to throw Cassie's birthday party at Grey House, the bed and breakfast where they live, but the property has already been reserved for that night. Later, Gwen is shocked to see her estranged son Drew (Robin Dunne), who is in town to conduct business and to plan his wedding. She loves him, but is unhappy with his inability to take responsibility for his actions.

Cassie's friend Martha Tinsdale (Catherine Disher) complains to Cassie that a recent heat wave is causing a sewage spill to stink up her new wedding planning business. Cassie tries to help, giving her special incense to clear the air, which makes the store smell even worse. Then, Drew cancels his wedding plans because he can't pay for it. A page of a contract that he was supposed to sign went missing in the satchel that Cassie gave him and he instead signed away his product. Both he and Martha blame Cassie for her "help".

Cassie asks her stepdaughter, Lori, who is a journalism student, to return a library book for her. At the library, Lori sees a book with Elizabeth Merriwick, the "Grey Lady" and Cassie's great-aunt, on the cover. It's the same image as the portrait in Cassie and Jake's living room. Intrigued, Lori reads the book to discover the Grey Lady and Cassie share the same birthday, which is also the day the Grey Lady disappeared, leading people to believe she was abducted. Lori then finds Merriwick's diary in a hidden room of the Grey House. Numerous parallels arise between the dated journal entries and current events, including the heat wave and now a mysterious fire that has broken out in Cassie's store, Bell, Book & Candle, damaging it and the surrounding buildings. Lori worries Cassie might be cursed.

Back at the Russells', Mia then discovers the Grey Lady painting has ripped and takes it home to begin restoring it, using her art major skills. Brandon and new girlfriend Tara (Ashley Leggat) decide to elope, but rush home when Cassie suddenly faints from dehydration. After making threatening remarks to Cassie, Drew is arrested on suspicion of her store's arson. Gwen doesn't believe her son set the fire and bails him out with the money they were planning to use for Cassie's now cancelled party.

The morning of Cassie's birthday arrives and Mia returns the restored painting to Cassie. Drew menacingly approaches Cassie during her walk, but she advises him on relationships and personal responsibility. Two hours later, however, she has still not returned home. A worried Jake also discovers the restored Grey Lady painting is missing.

A search for Cassie begins. It appears someone has broken into the Grey House and might still be there. Jake, Brandon, Lori, George and Gwen carefully enter the dark house, where they see Cassie dressed up. She leads the group to the backyard, which she has decorated for her birthday in a Halloween/harvest theme, complete with costumes for everyone. She planned her own party, but it was most important for her family and friends to arrive together.

Lori gives Cassie an old book written by Edward Whymark, a pseudonym for Elizabeth Merriwick, who wasn't abducted—she ran away to Texas with sweetheart Andrew Whymark and reinvented herself, living a long and fruitful life. Cassie congratulates Lori on her detective skills and knows she will do great on her journalism project. A masked Drew arrives with the stolen Grey Lady portrait, which he had appraised at the local museum. He tells Mia the museum liked her restoration work so much they want to hire her. Drew also makes peace with his mother, giving credit to Cassie for helping him realize his responsibilities. Meanwhile, it's revealed that a painter's rag, dropped in a cardboard box filled with paper, caused the fire at Cassie's store, not Drew. Brandon and Tara announce they still plan on getting married, but in two years time. Jake is thrilled and dances with Cassie, who is content among her party guests.

== Cast ==
- Catherine Bell as Mayor Cassandra "Cassie" Nightingale
- Chris Potter as Chief Jake Russell
- Hannah Endicott-Douglas as Lori Russell
- Matthew Knight as Brandon Russell
- Peter MacNeill as George O'Hanrahan
- Catherine Disher as Martha Tinsdale
- Robin Dunne as Drew
- Elizabeth Lennie as Gwen
- Noah Cappe as Deputy Derek Sanders
- Dani Kind as Mia
- Ashley Leggat as Tara
- Kate Todd as Helen
- Lisa Ryder as Alicia Quince

== Reception ==
=== Ratings ===
In its original airing, The Good Witch's Destiny was watched by 2.82 million viewers. It was Hallmark Channel's most watched original movie to date for 2013 among the network's core demographic, women aged 25–54.

=== Critical reception ===
Emily Ashby of Common Sense Media, which informs parents about media choices for their children, gave Destiny a four-star rating out of five, stating, "There are a few tense moments when a character's fate is unknown, but it's quickly resolved and holds no real scares". She added, "This story's meandering pace might be a hard sell for tweens, but if you can get yours to watch with you, you'll find all kinds of talking points about relationships, overcoming challenges, and the value of strong family bonds".
